

336001–336100 

|-bgcolor=#d6d6d6
| 336001 ||  || — || October 9, 2007 || Kitt Peak || Spacewatch || — || align=right | 3.3 km || 
|-id=002 bgcolor=#d6d6d6
| 336002 ||  || — || October 11, 2007 || Catalina || CSS || — || align=right | 3.3 km || 
|-id=003 bgcolor=#d6d6d6
| 336003 ||  || — || October 15, 2007 || Mount Lemmon || Mount Lemmon Survey || — || align=right | 3.7 km || 
|-id=004 bgcolor=#d6d6d6
| 336004 ||  || — || October 11, 2007 || Catalina || CSS || HYG || align=right | 3.4 km || 
|-id=005 bgcolor=#d6d6d6
| 336005 ||  || — || October 13, 2007 || Catalina || CSS || — || align=right | 4.7 km || 
|-id=006 bgcolor=#d6d6d6
| 336006 ||  || — || October 15, 2007 || Catalina || CSS || — || align=right | 3.6 km || 
|-id=007 bgcolor=#d6d6d6
| 336007 ||  || — || October 15, 2007 || Catalina || CSS || URS || align=right | 4.3 km || 
|-id=008 bgcolor=#d6d6d6
| 336008 ||  || — || October 13, 2007 || Kitt Peak || Spacewatch || KOR || align=right | 1.5 km || 
|-id=009 bgcolor=#d6d6d6
| 336009 ||  || — || October 15, 2007 || Catalina || CSS || — || align=right | 4.1 km || 
|-id=010 bgcolor=#d6d6d6
| 336010 ||  || — || October 15, 2007 || Kitt Peak || Spacewatch || — || align=right | 4.4 km || 
|-id=011 bgcolor=#d6d6d6
| 336011 ||  || — || October 15, 2007 || Mount Lemmon || Mount Lemmon Survey || VER || align=right | 3.0 km || 
|-id=012 bgcolor=#d6d6d6
| 336012 ||  || — || October 12, 2007 || Catalina || CSS || — || align=right | 3.3 km || 
|-id=013 bgcolor=#d6d6d6
| 336013 ||  || — || October 8, 2007 || Catalina || CSS || TEL || align=right | 2.0 km || 
|-id=014 bgcolor=#d6d6d6
| 336014 ||  || — || October 8, 2007 || Catalina || CSS || — || align=right | 3.6 km || 
|-id=015 bgcolor=#d6d6d6
| 336015 ||  || — || October 10, 2007 || Catalina || CSS || — || align=right | 3.9 km || 
|-id=016 bgcolor=#fefefe
| 336016 ||  || — || October 6, 2007 || Kitt Peak || Spacewatch || H || align=right data-sort-value="0.54" | 540 m || 
|-id=017 bgcolor=#d6d6d6
| 336017 ||  || — || October 9, 2007 || Socorro || LINEAR || — || align=right | 3.2 km || 
|-id=018 bgcolor=#d6d6d6
| 336018 ||  || — || October 11, 2007 || Kitt Peak || Spacewatch || — || align=right | 4.1 km || 
|-id=019 bgcolor=#d6d6d6
| 336019 ||  || — || October 16, 2007 || Catalina || CSS || — || align=right | 4.9 km || 
|-id=020 bgcolor=#d6d6d6
| 336020 ||  || — || January 30, 2004 || Kitt Peak || Spacewatch || — || align=right | 3.2 km || 
|-id=021 bgcolor=#d6d6d6
| 336021 ||  || — || October 19, 2007 || Catalina || CSS || HYG || align=right | 3.4 km || 
|-id=022 bgcolor=#d6d6d6
| 336022 ||  || — || October 19, 2007 || Catalina || CSS || — || align=right | 3.6 km || 
|-id=023 bgcolor=#d6d6d6
| 336023 ||  || — || October 19, 2007 || Catalina || CSS || — || align=right | 3.0 km || 
|-id=024 bgcolor=#d6d6d6
| 336024 ||  || — || October 20, 2007 || Catalina || CSS || — || align=right | 3.8 km || 
|-id=025 bgcolor=#d6d6d6
| 336025 ||  || — || October 30, 2007 || Kitt Peak || Spacewatch || THM || align=right | 2.7 km || 
|-id=026 bgcolor=#d6d6d6
| 336026 ||  || — || October 31, 2007 || Catalina || CSS || — || align=right | 3.7 km || 
|-id=027 bgcolor=#d6d6d6
| 336027 ||  || — || October 8, 2007 || Anderson Mesa || LONEOS || TIR || align=right | 3.8 km || 
|-id=028 bgcolor=#d6d6d6
| 336028 ||  || — || October 31, 2007 || Catalina || CSS || — || align=right | 3.2 km || 
|-id=029 bgcolor=#d6d6d6
| 336029 ||  || — || October 16, 2007 || Catalina || CSS || URS || align=right | 5.9 km || 
|-id=030 bgcolor=#d6d6d6
| 336030 ||  || — || November 1, 2007 || Lulin Observatory || LUSS || — || align=right | 5.1 km || 
|-id=031 bgcolor=#d6d6d6
| 336031 ||  || — || November 6, 2007 || Mayhill || A. Lowe || — || align=right | 4.1 km || 
|-id=032 bgcolor=#d6d6d6
| 336032 ||  || — || November 1, 2007 || Kitt Peak || Spacewatch || HYG || align=right | 2.8 km || 
|-id=033 bgcolor=#d6d6d6
| 336033 ||  || — || November 4, 2007 || Kitt Peak || Spacewatch || — || align=right | 3.7 km || 
|-id=034 bgcolor=#d6d6d6
| 336034 ||  || — || November 5, 2007 || Kitt Peak || Spacewatch || — || align=right | 2.8 km || 
|-id=035 bgcolor=#d6d6d6
| 336035 ||  || — || November 3, 2007 || Kitt Peak || Spacewatch || — || align=right | 3.5 km || 
|-id=036 bgcolor=#d6d6d6
| 336036 ||  || — || November 7, 2007 || Mount Lemmon || Mount Lemmon Survey || — || align=right | 3.4 km || 
|-id=037 bgcolor=#d6d6d6
| 336037 ||  || — || November 9, 2007 || Kitt Peak || Spacewatch || — || align=right | 2.9 km || 
|-id=038 bgcolor=#d6d6d6
| 336038 ||  || — || October 18, 2007 || Kitt Peak || Spacewatch || — || align=right | 2.9 km || 
|-id=039 bgcolor=#d6d6d6
| 336039 ||  || — || November 12, 2007 || Catalina || CSS || — || align=right | 4.8 km || 
|-id=040 bgcolor=#d6d6d6
| 336040 ||  || — || November 11, 2007 || Catalina || CSS || — || align=right | 3.5 km || 
|-id=041 bgcolor=#d6d6d6
| 336041 ||  || — || November 12, 2007 || Catalina || CSS || — || align=right | 5.7 km || 
|-id=042 bgcolor=#d6d6d6
| 336042 ||  || — || November 7, 2007 || Catalina || CSS || — || align=right | 3.3 km || 
|-id=043 bgcolor=#d6d6d6
| 336043 || 2007 WZ || — || November 16, 2007 || Dauban || Chante-Perdrix Obs. || — || align=right | 3.4 km || 
|-id=044 bgcolor=#d6d6d6
| 336044 ||  || — || November 16, 2007 || Mount Lemmon || Mount Lemmon Survey || EOS || align=right | 2.3 km || 
|-id=045 bgcolor=#fefefe
| 336045 ||  || — || December 30, 2007 || Catalina || CSS || H || align=right data-sort-value="0.74" | 740 m || 
|-id=046 bgcolor=#fefefe
| 336046 ||  || — || January 11, 2008 || Kitt Peak || Spacewatch || — || align=right data-sort-value="0.81" | 810 m || 
|-id=047 bgcolor=#fefefe
| 336047 ||  || — || January 13, 2008 || Catalina || CSS || H || align=right data-sort-value="0.92" | 920 m || 
|-id=048 bgcolor=#fefefe
| 336048 ||  || — || February 2, 2008 || Mount Lemmon || Mount Lemmon Survey || — || align=right data-sort-value="0.85" | 850 m || 
|-id=049 bgcolor=#fefefe
| 336049 ||  || — || February 2, 2008 || Kitt Peak || Spacewatch || — || align=right data-sort-value="0.65" | 650 m || 
|-id=050 bgcolor=#fefefe
| 336050 ||  || — || January 30, 2008 || Mount Lemmon || Mount Lemmon Survey || — || align=right | 1.1 km || 
|-id=051 bgcolor=#fefefe
| 336051 ||  || — || February 8, 2008 || Kitt Peak || Spacewatch || — || align=right data-sort-value="0.91" | 910 m || 
|-id=052 bgcolor=#fefefe
| 336052 ||  || — || February 9, 2008 || Kitt Peak || Spacewatch || — || align=right data-sort-value="0.59" | 590 m || 
|-id=053 bgcolor=#FA8072
| 336053 ||  || — || February 13, 2008 || Mount Lemmon || Mount Lemmon Survey || — || align=right | 1.2 km || 
|-id=054 bgcolor=#fefefe
| 336054 ||  || — || October 3, 2006 || Mount Lemmon || Mount Lemmon Survey || — || align=right | 1.0 km || 
|-id=055 bgcolor=#fefefe
| 336055 ||  || — || February 25, 2008 || Mount Lemmon || Mount Lemmon Survey || V || align=right data-sort-value="0.68" | 680 m || 
|-id=056 bgcolor=#fefefe
| 336056 ||  || — || February 29, 2008 || Kitt Peak || Spacewatch || — || align=right data-sort-value="0.75" | 750 m || 
|-id=057 bgcolor=#fefefe
| 336057 ||  || — || March 2, 2008 || Kitt Peak || Spacewatch || — || align=right data-sort-value="0.90" | 900 m || 
|-id=058 bgcolor=#fefefe
| 336058 ||  || — || March 3, 2008 || XuYi || PMO NEO || — || align=right data-sort-value="0.74" | 740 m || 
|-id=059 bgcolor=#fefefe
| 336059 ||  || — || March 5, 2008 || Mount Lemmon || Mount Lemmon Survey || FLO || align=right data-sort-value="0.67" | 670 m || 
|-id=060 bgcolor=#fefefe
| 336060 ||  || — || March 7, 2008 || Catalina || CSS || FLO || align=right data-sort-value="0.77" | 770 m || 
|-id=061 bgcolor=#fefefe
| 336061 ||  || — || March 8, 2008 || Mount Lemmon || Mount Lemmon Survey || — || align=right data-sort-value="0.95" | 950 m || 
|-id=062 bgcolor=#fefefe
| 336062 ||  || — || March 8, 2008 || Kitt Peak || Spacewatch || — || align=right data-sort-value="0.65" | 650 m || 
|-id=063 bgcolor=#fefefe
| 336063 ||  || — || March 9, 2008 || Kitt Peak || Spacewatch || — || align=right data-sort-value="0.78" | 780 m || 
|-id=064 bgcolor=#fefefe
| 336064 ||  || — || March 11, 2008 || Kitt Peak || Spacewatch || FLO || align=right data-sort-value="0.58" | 580 m || 
|-id=065 bgcolor=#fefefe
| 336065 ||  || — || March 1, 2008 || Kitt Peak || Spacewatch || — || align=right data-sort-value="0.78" | 780 m || 
|-id=066 bgcolor=#fefefe
| 336066 ||  || — || March 25, 2008 || Kitt Peak || Spacewatch || — || align=right data-sort-value="0.62" | 620 m || 
|-id=067 bgcolor=#fefefe
| 336067 ||  || — || March 26, 2008 || Kitt Peak || Spacewatch || ERI || align=right | 1.5 km || 
|-id=068 bgcolor=#C2FFFF
| 336068 ||  || — || March 27, 2008 || Kitt Peak || Spacewatch || L5 || align=right | 13 km || 
|-id=069 bgcolor=#fefefe
| 336069 ||  || — || March 28, 2008 || Mount Lemmon || Mount Lemmon Survey || FLO || align=right data-sort-value="0.61" | 610 m || 
|-id=070 bgcolor=#fefefe
| 336070 ||  || — || March 29, 2008 || Kitt Peak || Spacewatch || NYS || align=right data-sort-value="0.63" | 630 m || 
|-id=071 bgcolor=#fefefe
| 336071 ||  || — || March 28, 2008 || Mount Lemmon || Mount Lemmon Survey || MAS || align=right data-sort-value="0.74" | 740 m || 
|-id=072 bgcolor=#fefefe
| 336072 ||  || — || March 28, 2008 || Mount Lemmon || Mount Lemmon Survey || NYS || align=right data-sort-value="0.63" | 630 m || 
|-id=073 bgcolor=#fefefe
| 336073 ||  || — || March 28, 2008 || Kitt Peak || Spacewatch || FLO || align=right data-sort-value="0.60" | 600 m || 
|-id=074 bgcolor=#C2FFFF
| 336074 ||  || — || September 26, 2001 || Eskridge || G. Hug || L5 || align=right | 13 km || 
|-id=075 bgcolor=#fefefe
| 336075 ||  || — || March 29, 2008 || Mount Lemmon || Mount Lemmon Survey || — || align=right data-sort-value="0.75" | 750 m || 
|-id=076 bgcolor=#fefefe
| 336076 ||  || — || March 30, 2008 || Kitt Peak || Spacewatch || — || align=right data-sort-value="0.82" | 820 m || 
|-id=077 bgcolor=#fefefe
| 336077 ||  || — || March 31, 2008 || Kitt Peak || Spacewatch || — || align=right data-sort-value="0.73" | 730 m || 
|-id=078 bgcolor=#fefefe
| 336078 ||  || — || March 31, 2008 || Kitt Peak || Spacewatch || FLO || align=right data-sort-value="0.77" | 770 m || 
|-id=079 bgcolor=#fefefe
| 336079 ||  || — || April 2, 2008 || La Sagra || OAM Obs. || — || align=right data-sort-value="0.87" | 870 m || 
|-id=080 bgcolor=#fefefe
| 336080 ||  || — || April 1, 2008 || Kitt Peak || Spacewatch || FLO || align=right data-sort-value="0.74" | 740 m || 
|-id=081 bgcolor=#fefefe
| 336081 ||  || — || April 3, 2008 || Mount Lemmon || Mount Lemmon Survey || — || align=right data-sort-value="0.75" | 750 m || 
|-id=082 bgcolor=#fefefe
| 336082 ||  || — || April 3, 2008 || Kitt Peak || Spacewatch || — || align=right data-sort-value="0.89" | 890 m || 
|-id=083 bgcolor=#fefefe
| 336083 ||  || — || April 3, 2008 || Kitt Peak || Spacewatch || — || align=right data-sort-value="0.78" | 780 m || 
|-id=084 bgcolor=#fefefe
| 336084 ||  || — || April 5, 2008 || Catalina || CSS || — || align=right | 1.0 km || 
|-id=085 bgcolor=#fefefe
| 336085 ||  || — || April 5, 2008 || Kitt Peak || Spacewatch || — || align=right data-sort-value="0.81" | 810 m || 
|-id=086 bgcolor=#fefefe
| 336086 ||  || — || April 7, 2008 || Kitt Peak || Spacewatch || V || align=right data-sort-value="0.67" | 670 m || 
|-id=087 bgcolor=#fefefe
| 336087 ||  || — || April 6, 2008 || Mount Lemmon || Mount Lemmon Survey || FLO || align=right data-sort-value="0.72" | 720 m || 
|-id=088 bgcolor=#fefefe
| 336088 ||  || — || April 9, 2008 || Kitt Peak || Spacewatch || — || align=right data-sort-value="0.74" | 740 m || 
|-id=089 bgcolor=#fefefe
| 336089 ||  || — || April 12, 2008 || Catalina || CSS || — || align=right | 1.0 km || 
|-id=090 bgcolor=#fefefe
| 336090 ||  || — || April 13, 2008 || Mount Lemmon || Mount Lemmon Survey || — || align=right data-sort-value="0.73" | 730 m || 
|-id=091 bgcolor=#fefefe
| 336091 ||  || — || April 11, 2008 || Kitt Peak || Spacewatch || — || align=right data-sort-value="0.71" | 710 m || 
|-id=092 bgcolor=#fefefe
| 336092 ||  || — || April 13, 2008 || Kitt Peak || Spacewatch || — || align=right data-sort-value="0.74" | 740 m || 
|-id=093 bgcolor=#fefefe
| 336093 ||  || — || April 3, 2008 || Kitt Peak || Spacewatch || NYS || align=right data-sort-value="0.77" | 770 m || 
|-id=094 bgcolor=#fefefe
| 336094 ||  || — || April 24, 2008 || Andrushivka || Andrushivka Obs. || V || align=right data-sort-value="0.73" | 730 m || 
|-id=095 bgcolor=#fefefe
| 336095 ||  || — || April 26, 2008 || Dauban || F. Kugel || — || align=right data-sort-value="0.76" | 760 m || 
|-id=096 bgcolor=#fefefe
| 336096 ||  || — || April 24, 2008 || Kitt Peak || Spacewatch || NYS || align=right data-sort-value="0.71" | 710 m || 
|-id=097 bgcolor=#fefefe
| 336097 ||  || — || April 25, 2008 || Kitt Peak || Spacewatch || — || align=right data-sort-value="0.82" | 820 m || 
|-id=098 bgcolor=#fefefe
| 336098 ||  || — || April 27, 2008 || Kitt Peak || Spacewatch || ERI || align=right | 1.9 km || 
|-id=099 bgcolor=#fefefe
| 336099 ||  || — || April 27, 2008 || Kitt Peak || Spacewatch || ERI || align=right | 1.4 km || 
|-id=100 bgcolor=#fefefe
| 336100 ||  || — || April 27, 2008 || Mount Lemmon || Mount Lemmon Survey || NYS || align=right data-sort-value="0.72" | 720 m || 
|}

336101–336200 

|-bgcolor=#fefefe
| 336101 ||  || — || April 29, 2008 || Kitt Peak || Spacewatch || V || align=right data-sort-value="0.55" | 550 m || 
|-id=102 bgcolor=#fefefe
| 336102 ||  || — || April 30, 2008 || Mount Lemmon || Mount Lemmon Survey || — || align=right data-sort-value="0.68" | 680 m || 
|-id=103 bgcolor=#fefefe
| 336103 ||  || — || April 30, 2008 || Mount Lemmon || Mount Lemmon Survey || V || align=right data-sort-value="0.79" | 790 m || 
|-id=104 bgcolor=#fefefe
| 336104 ||  || — || April 24, 2008 || Mount Lemmon || Mount Lemmon Survey || — || align=right data-sort-value="0.94" | 940 m || 
|-id=105 bgcolor=#fefefe
| 336105 ||  || — || April 29, 2008 || Kitt Peak || Spacewatch || MAS || align=right data-sort-value="0.70" | 700 m || 
|-id=106 bgcolor=#fefefe
| 336106 ||  || — || April 26, 2008 || Kitt Peak || Spacewatch || — || align=right data-sort-value="0.96" | 960 m || 
|-id=107 bgcolor=#fefefe
| 336107 ||  || — || May 2, 2008 || Kitt Peak || Spacewatch || — || align=right data-sort-value="0.85" | 850 m || 
|-id=108 bgcolor=#fefefe
| 336108 Luberon ||  ||  || May 2, 2008 || Vicques || M. Ory || MAS || align=right data-sort-value="0.84" | 840 m || 
|-id=109 bgcolor=#fefefe
| 336109 ||  || — || May 2, 2008 || Moletai || Molėtai Obs. || — || align=right | 1.1 km || 
|-id=110 bgcolor=#fefefe
| 336110 ||  || — || May 9, 2008 || Grove Creek || F. Tozzi || — || align=right | 1.1 km || 
|-id=111 bgcolor=#fefefe
| 336111 ||  || — || May 15, 2008 || Kitt Peak || Spacewatch || — || align=right data-sort-value="0.95" | 950 m || 
|-id=112 bgcolor=#fefefe
| 336112 ||  || — || May 9, 2008 || Siding Spring || SSS || — || align=right | 1.7 km || 
|-id=113 bgcolor=#fefefe
| 336113 ||  || — || May 3, 2008 || Mount Lemmon || Mount Lemmon Survey || MAS || align=right data-sort-value="0.92" | 920 m || 
|-id=114 bgcolor=#fefefe
| 336114 ||  || — || May 26, 2008 || Kitt Peak || Spacewatch || V || align=right data-sort-value="0.67" | 670 m || 
|-id=115 bgcolor=#fefefe
| 336115 ||  || — || May 27, 2008 || Mount Lemmon || Mount Lemmon Survey || V || align=right data-sort-value="0.65" | 650 m || 
|-id=116 bgcolor=#fefefe
| 336116 ||  || — || April 28, 2001 || Kitt Peak || Spacewatch || — || align=right data-sort-value="0.69" | 690 m || 
|-id=117 bgcolor=#fefefe
| 336117 ||  || — || June 9, 2008 || Kitt Peak || Spacewatch || V || align=right data-sort-value="0.58" | 580 m || 
|-id=118 bgcolor=#C2FFFF
| 336118 ||  || — || March 29, 2008 || Kitt Peak || Spacewatch || L5 || align=right | 8.8 km || 
|-id=119 bgcolor=#fefefe
| 336119 ||  || — || July 7, 2008 || La Sagra || OAM Obs. || — || align=right | 1.4 km || 
|-id=120 bgcolor=#fefefe
| 336120 ||  || — || July 14, 2008 || Antares || ARO || — || align=right | 1.0 km || 
|-id=121 bgcolor=#fefefe
| 336121 ||  || — || July 25, 2008 || Siding Spring || SSS || — || align=right | 1.7 km || 
|-id=122 bgcolor=#fefefe
| 336122 ||  || — || July 29, 2008 || La Sagra || OAM Obs. || NYS || align=right data-sort-value="0.96" | 960 m || 
|-id=123 bgcolor=#fefefe
| 336123 ||  || — || July 31, 2008 || Dauban || F. Kugel || — || align=right | 1.1 km || 
|-id=124 bgcolor=#fefefe
| 336124 ||  || — || July 29, 2008 || La Sagra || OAM Obs. || NYS || align=right data-sort-value="0.71" | 710 m || 
|-id=125 bgcolor=#E9E9E9
| 336125 ||  || — || July 26, 2008 || Siding Spring || SSS || — || align=right | 1.2 km || 
|-id=126 bgcolor=#E9E9E9
| 336126 ||  || — || July 29, 2008 || Kitt Peak || Spacewatch || — || align=right | 1.1 km || 
|-id=127 bgcolor=#E9E9E9
| 336127 ||  || — || July 29, 2008 || Mount Lemmon || Mount Lemmon Survey || AER || align=right | 1.6 km || 
|-id=128 bgcolor=#fefefe
| 336128 ||  || — || August 5, 2008 || Hibiscus || S. F. Hönig, N. Teamo || — || align=right data-sort-value="0.96" | 960 m || 
|-id=129 bgcolor=#E9E9E9
| 336129 ||  || — || August 5, 2008 || La Sagra || OAM Obs. || — || align=right | 1.3 km || 
|-id=130 bgcolor=#E9E9E9
| 336130 ||  || — || August 6, 2008 || La Sagra || OAM Obs. || JNS || align=right | 3.0 km || 
|-id=131 bgcolor=#fefefe
| 336131 ||  || — || August 7, 2008 || Reedy Creek || J. Broughton || fast? || align=right data-sort-value="0.94" | 940 m || 
|-id=132 bgcolor=#fefefe
| 336132 ||  || — || December 1, 2005 || Mount Lemmon || Mount Lemmon Survey || — || align=right | 1.1 km || 
|-id=133 bgcolor=#E9E9E9
| 336133 ||  || — || August 5, 2008 || Siding Spring || SSS || — || align=right | 1.6 km || 
|-id=134 bgcolor=#E9E9E9
| 336134 ||  || — || August 2, 2008 || Siding Spring || SSS || — || align=right | 1.4 km || 
|-id=135 bgcolor=#E9E9E9
| 336135 ||  || — || August 24, 2008 || La Sagra || OAM Obs. || EUN || align=right | 1.5 km || 
|-id=136 bgcolor=#E9E9E9
| 336136 ||  || — || July 29, 2008 || Kitt Peak || Spacewatch || — || align=right | 1.0 km || 
|-id=137 bgcolor=#fefefe
| 336137 ||  || — || August 25, 2008 || La Sagra || OAM Obs. || MAS || align=right data-sort-value="0.88" | 880 m || 
|-id=138 bgcolor=#E9E9E9
| 336138 ||  || — || August 25, 2008 || La Sagra || OAM Obs. || — || align=right | 1.2 km || 
|-id=139 bgcolor=#fefefe
| 336139 ||  || — || August 26, 2008 || La Sagra || OAM Obs. || NYS || align=right data-sort-value="0.86" | 860 m || 
|-id=140 bgcolor=#E9E9E9
| 336140 ||  || — || August 27, 2008 || Prairie Grass || J. Mahony || — || align=right data-sort-value="0.95" | 950 m || 
|-id=141 bgcolor=#E9E9E9
| 336141 ||  || — || August 27, 2008 || La Sagra || OAM Obs. || — || align=right | 2.4 km || 
|-id=142 bgcolor=#E9E9E9
| 336142 ||  || — || August 29, 2008 || Dauban || F. Kugel || — || align=right | 2.2 km || 
|-id=143 bgcolor=#E9E9E9
| 336143 ||  || — || August 26, 2008 || Socorro || LINEAR || — || align=right | 1.8 km || 
|-id=144 bgcolor=#E9E9E9
| 336144 ||  || — || August 26, 2008 || Socorro || LINEAR || — || align=right | 3.2 km || 
|-id=145 bgcolor=#E9E9E9
| 336145 ||  || — || August 30, 2008 || La Sagra || OAM Obs. || — || align=right | 1.6 km || 
|-id=146 bgcolor=#E9E9E9
| 336146 ||  || — || August 30, 2008 || Socorro || LINEAR || JUN || align=right | 1.4 km || 
|-id=147 bgcolor=#E9E9E9
| 336147 ||  || — || August 21, 2008 || Kitt Peak || Spacewatch || — || align=right | 1.8 km || 
|-id=148 bgcolor=#E9E9E9
| 336148 ||  || — || August 24, 2008 || Kitt Peak || Spacewatch || — || align=right | 1.8 km || 
|-id=149 bgcolor=#E9E9E9
| 336149 ||  || — || August 26, 2008 || La Sagra || OAM Obs. || — || align=right data-sort-value="0.81" | 810 m || 
|-id=150 bgcolor=#E9E9E9
| 336150 ||  || — || August 23, 2008 || Kitt Peak || Spacewatch || — || align=right | 2.0 km || 
|-id=151 bgcolor=#E9E9E9
| 336151 ||  || — || August 26, 2008 || Socorro || LINEAR || RAF || align=right data-sort-value="0.97" | 970 m || 
|-id=152 bgcolor=#E9E9E9
| 336152 ||  || — || August 21, 2008 || Kitt Peak || Spacewatch || KON || align=right | 3.3 km || 
|-id=153 bgcolor=#E9E9E9
| 336153 ||  || — || September 1, 2008 || Hibiscus || S. F. Hönig, N. Teamo || — || align=right | 1.2 km || 
|-id=154 bgcolor=#E9E9E9
| 336154 ||  || — || September 3, 2008 || Pla D'Arguines || R. Ferrando || EUN || align=right | 1.3 km || 
|-id=155 bgcolor=#fefefe
| 336155 ||  || — || September 4, 2008 || Calvin-Rehoboth || L. A. Molnar || NYS || align=right data-sort-value="0.72" | 720 m || 
|-id=156 bgcolor=#E9E9E9
| 336156 ||  || — || September 2, 2008 || Kitt Peak || Spacewatch || — || align=right | 1.5 km || 
|-id=157 bgcolor=#E9E9E9
| 336157 ||  || — || September 3, 2008 || Kitt Peak || Spacewatch || — || align=right | 1.5 km || 
|-id=158 bgcolor=#E9E9E9
| 336158 ||  || — || September 3, 2008 || Kitt Peak || Spacewatch || — || align=right | 3.0 km || 
|-id=159 bgcolor=#E9E9E9
| 336159 ||  || — || September 4, 2008 || Kitt Peak || Spacewatch || — || align=right | 1.7 km || 
|-id=160 bgcolor=#E9E9E9
| 336160 ||  || — || September 4, 2008 || Kitt Peak || Spacewatch || EUN || align=right | 1.0 km || 
|-id=161 bgcolor=#E9E9E9
| 336161 ||  || — || August 24, 2008 || Kitt Peak || Spacewatch || — || align=right | 1.2 km || 
|-id=162 bgcolor=#fefefe
| 336162 ||  || — || September 2, 2008 || La Sagra || OAM Obs. || — || align=right | 1.4 km || 
|-id=163 bgcolor=#E9E9E9
| 336163 ||  || — || September 3, 2008 || La Sagra || OAM Obs. || — || align=right | 1.3 km || 
|-id=164 bgcolor=#E9E9E9
| 336164 ||  || — || September 4, 2008 || Socorro || LINEAR || — || align=right | 1.9 km || 
|-id=165 bgcolor=#E9E9E9
| 336165 ||  || — || September 5, 2008 || Socorro || LINEAR || — || align=right | 2.0 km || 
|-id=166 bgcolor=#E9E9E9
| 336166 ||  || — || September 8, 2008 || Dauban || F. Kugel || BRG || align=right | 1.6 km || 
|-id=167 bgcolor=#E9E9E9
| 336167 ||  || — || September 2, 2008 || Kitt Peak || Spacewatch || — || align=right | 2.0 km || 
|-id=168 bgcolor=#E9E9E9
| 336168 ||  || — || September 2, 2008 || Kitt Peak || Spacewatch || — || align=right | 2.4 km || 
|-id=169 bgcolor=#E9E9E9
| 336169 ||  || — || September 2, 2008 || Kitt Peak || Spacewatch || — || align=right data-sort-value="0.91" | 910 m || 
|-id=170 bgcolor=#E9E9E9
| 336170 ||  || — || September 2, 2008 || Kitt Peak || Spacewatch || EUN || align=right | 1.4 km || 
|-id=171 bgcolor=#E9E9E9
| 336171 ||  || — || September 2, 2008 || Kitt Peak || Spacewatch || ADE || align=right | 2.3 km || 
|-id=172 bgcolor=#E9E9E9
| 336172 ||  || — || September 2, 2008 || Kitt Peak || Spacewatch || HEN || align=right | 1.1 km || 
|-id=173 bgcolor=#E9E9E9
| 336173 ||  || — || September 2, 2008 || Kitt Peak || Spacewatch || — || align=right | 1.7 km || 
|-id=174 bgcolor=#E9E9E9
| 336174 ||  || — || September 2, 2008 || Kitt Peak || Spacewatch || — || align=right | 1.1 km || 
|-id=175 bgcolor=#E9E9E9
| 336175 ||  || — || September 3, 2008 || Kitt Peak || Spacewatch || — || align=right | 1.4 km || 
|-id=176 bgcolor=#fefefe
| 336176 ||  || — || September 4, 2008 || Kitt Peak || Spacewatch || V || align=right data-sort-value="0.91" | 910 m || 
|-id=177 bgcolor=#E9E9E9
| 336177 Churri ||  ||  || September 14, 2008 || La Cañada || J. Lacruz || — || align=right | 1.3 km || 
|-id=178 bgcolor=#E9E9E9
| 336178 ||  || — || September 5, 2008 || Kitt Peak || Spacewatch || — || align=right | 3.0 km || 
|-id=179 bgcolor=#E9E9E9
| 336179 ||  || — || September 5, 2008 || Kitt Peak || Spacewatch || — || align=right | 2.3 km || 
|-id=180 bgcolor=#E9E9E9
| 336180 ||  || — || September 5, 2008 || Kitt Peak || Spacewatch || — || align=right | 1.9 km || 
|-id=181 bgcolor=#E9E9E9
| 336181 ||  || — || September 5, 2008 || Kitt Peak || Spacewatch || — || align=right | 3.0 km || 
|-id=182 bgcolor=#E9E9E9
| 336182 ||  || — || September 7, 2008 || Catalina || CSS || — || align=right | 1.7 km || 
|-id=183 bgcolor=#E9E9E9
| 336183 ||  || — || September 5, 2008 || Kitt Peak || Spacewatch || — || align=right | 3.9 km || 
|-id=184 bgcolor=#E9E9E9
| 336184 ||  || — || September 7, 2008 || Mount Lemmon || Mount Lemmon Survey || — || align=right | 1.6 km || 
|-id=185 bgcolor=#E9E9E9
| 336185 ||  || — || September 5, 2008 || Kitt Peak || Spacewatch || WIT || align=right | 1.3 km || 
|-id=186 bgcolor=#E9E9E9
| 336186 ||  || — || September 5, 2008 || Kitt Peak || Spacewatch || HOF || align=right | 2.7 km || 
|-id=187 bgcolor=#E9E9E9
| 336187 ||  || — || September 6, 2008 || Mount Lemmon || Mount Lemmon Survey || — || align=right | 1.5 km || 
|-id=188 bgcolor=#E9E9E9
| 336188 ||  || — || September 9, 2008 || Mount Lemmon || Mount Lemmon Survey || — || align=right | 1.2 km || 
|-id=189 bgcolor=#E9E9E9
| 336189 ||  || — || August 23, 2008 || Socorro || LINEAR || — || align=right | 2.9 km || 
|-id=190 bgcolor=#E9E9E9
| 336190 ||  || — || September 9, 2008 || Catalina || CSS || — || align=right | 1.8 km || 
|-id=191 bgcolor=#E9E9E9
| 336191 ||  || — || September 4, 2008 || Socorro || LINEAR || — || align=right | 2.6 km || 
|-id=192 bgcolor=#E9E9E9
| 336192 ||  || — || September 5, 2008 || Kitt Peak || Spacewatch || PAD || align=right | 3.0 km || 
|-id=193 bgcolor=#E9E9E9
| 336193 ||  || — || September 6, 2008 || Mount Lemmon || Mount Lemmon Survey || — || align=right data-sort-value="0.72" | 720 m || 
|-id=194 bgcolor=#E9E9E9
| 336194 ||  || — || September 9, 2008 || Catalina || CSS || — || align=right | 3.3 km || 
|-id=195 bgcolor=#E9E9E9
| 336195 ||  || — || September 9, 2008 || Mount Lemmon || Mount Lemmon Survey || — || align=right | 3.0 km || 
|-id=196 bgcolor=#E9E9E9
| 336196 ||  || — || September 5, 2008 || Kitt Peak || Spacewatch || — || align=right | 1.3 km || 
|-id=197 bgcolor=#E9E9E9
| 336197 ||  || — || September 3, 2008 || Kitt Peak || Spacewatch || — || align=right | 1.6 km || 
|-id=198 bgcolor=#E9E9E9
| 336198 ||  || — || September 23, 2008 || Grove Creek || F. Tozzi || EUN || align=right | 1.8 km || 
|-id=199 bgcolor=#E9E9E9
| 336199 ||  || — || September 22, 2008 || Socorro || LINEAR || — || align=right | 1.3 km || 
|-id=200 bgcolor=#E9E9E9
| 336200 ||  || — || September 22, 2008 || Socorro || LINEAR || — || align=right | 1.8 km || 
|}

336201–336300 

|-bgcolor=#E9E9E9
| 336201 ||  || — || September 22, 2008 || Socorro || LINEAR || — || align=right | 3.8 km || 
|-id=202 bgcolor=#E9E9E9
| 336202 ||  || — || September 22, 2008 || Socorro || LINEAR || — || align=right | 1.7 km || 
|-id=203 bgcolor=#E9E9E9
| 336203 Sandrobuss ||  ||  || September 22, 2008 || Vicques || M. Ory || MIS || align=right | 2.8 km || 
|-id=204 bgcolor=#E9E9E9
| 336204 Sardinas ||  ||  || September 24, 2008 || La Cañada || J. Lacruz || — || align=right data-sort-value="0.99" | 990 m || 
|-id=205 bgcolor=#E9E9E9
| 336205 ||  || — || September 19, 2008 || Kitt Peak || Spacewatch || — || align=right | 1.7 km || 
|-id=206 bgcolor=#E9E9E9
| 336206 ||  || — || September 19, 2008 || Kitt Peak || Spacewatch || — || align=right | 2.2 km || 
|-id=207 bgcolor=#E9E9E9
| 336207 ||  || — || September 20, 2008 || Kitt Peak || Spacewatch || — || align=right | 1.7 km || 
|-id=208 bgcolor=#E9E9E9
| 336208 ||  || — || September 20, 2008 || Kitt Peak || Spacewatch || — || align=right | 1.8 km || 
|-id=209 bgcolor=#E9E9E9
| 336209 ||  || — || September 20, 2008 || Kitt Peak || Spacewatch || — || align=right | 2.7 km || 
|-id=210 bgcolor=#E9E9E9
| 336210 ||  || — || September 20, 2008 || Kitt Peak || Spacewatch || — || align=right | 1.5 km || 
|-id=211 bgcolor=#E9E9E9
| 336211 ||  || — || September 20, 2008 || Kitt Peak || Spacewatch || — || align=right | 1.8 km || 
|-id=212 bgcolor=#fefefe
| 336212 ||  || — || September 20, 2008 || Kitt Peak || Spacewatch || — || align=right | 1.2 km || 
|-id=213 bgcolor=#E9E9E9
| 336213 ||  || — || September 20, 2008 || Kitt Peak || Spacewatch || AGN || align=right | 1.3 km || 
|-id=214 bgcolor=#E9E9E9
| 336214 ||  || — || September 20, 2008 || Mount Lemmon || Mount Lemmon Survey || — || align=right | 1.1 km || 
|-id=215 bgcolor=#E9E9E9
| 336215 ||  || — || September 20, 2008 || Mount Lemmon || Mount Lemmon Survey || — || align=right data-sort-value="0.84" | 840 m || 
|-id=216 bgcolor=#E9E9E9
| 336216 ||  || — || September 20, 2008 || Mount Lemmon || Mount Lemmon Survey || — || align=right | 1.4 km || 
|-id=217 bgcolor=#E9E9E9
| 336217 ||  || — || September 20, 2008 || Mount Lemmon || Mount Lemmon Survey || — || align=right | 2.2 km || 
|-id=218 bgcolor=#E9E9E9
| 336218 ||  || — || September 20, 2008 || Kitt Peak || Spacewatch || — || align=right | 2.7 km || 
|-id=219 bgcolor=#E9E9E9
| 336219 ||  || — || September 20, 2008 || Mount Lemmon || Mount Lemmon Survey || — || align=right | 2.3 km || 
|-id=220 bgcolor=#E9E9E9
| 336220 ||  || — || September 20, 2008 || Kitt Peak || Spacewatch || — || align=right | 2.0 km || 
|-id=221 bgcolor=#E9E9E9
| 336221 ||  || — || September 21, 2008 || Kitt Peak || Spacewatch || — || align=right | 1.4 km || 
|-id=222 bgcolor=#E9E9E9
| 336222 ||  || — || September 21, 2008 || Mount Lemmon || Mount Lemmon Survey || — || align=right data-sort-value="0.97" | 970 m || 
|-id=223 bgcolor=#E9E9E9
| 336223 ||  || — || September 22, 2008 || Catalina || CSS || EUN || align=right | 1.4 km || 
|-id=224 bgcolor=#E9E9E9
| 336224 ||  || — || September 23, 2008 || Kitt Peak || Spacewatch || — || align=right | 1.5 km || 
|-id=225 bgcolor=#E9E9E9
| 336225 ||  || — || September 23, 2008 || Mount Lemmon || Mount Lemmon Survey || NEM || align=right | 2.3 km || 
|-id=226 bgcolor=#E9E9E9
| 336226 ||  || — || September 23, 2008 || Mount Lemmon || Mount Lemmon Survey || — || align=right | 1.8 km || 
|-id=227 bgcolor=#E9E9E9
| 336227 ||  || — || September 23, 2008 || Mount Lemmon || Mount Lemmon Survey || GEF || align=right | 1.5 km || 
|-id=228 bgcolor=#E9E9E9
| 336228 ||  || — || September 25, 2008 || Sierra Stars || F. Tozzi || — || align=right | 1.3 km || 
|-id=229 bgcolor=#E9E9E9
| 336229 ||  || — || September 25, 2008 || Dauban || F. Kugel || DOR || align=right | 2.8 km || 
|-id=230 bgcolor=#E9E9E9
| 336230 ||  || — || September 20, 2008 || Kitt Peak || Spacewatch || — || align=right | 1.8 km || 
|-id=231 bgcolor=#E9E9E9
| 336231 ||  || — || September 21, 2008 || Kitt Peak || Spacewatch || — || align=right | 1.8 km || 
|-id=232 bgcolor=#d6d6d6
| 336232 ||  || — || September 21, 2008 || Kitt Peak || Spacewatch || — || align=right | 2.4 km || 
|-id=233 bgcolor=#E9E9E9
| 336233 ||  || — || September 21, 2008 || Kitt Peak || Spacewatch || — || align=right | 1.4 km || 
|-id=234 bgcolor=#E9E9E9
| 336234 ||  || — || September 21, 2008 || Kitt Peak || Spacewatch || AGN || align=right | 1.5 km || 
|-id=235 bgcolor=#E9E9E9
| 336235 ||  || — || September 21, 2008 || Kitt Peak || Spacewatch || — || align=right | 2.5 km || 
|-id=236 bgcolor=#E9E9E9
| 336236 ||  || — || September 21, 2008 || Kitt Peak || Spacewatch || — || align=right | 2.2 km || 
|-id=237 bgcolor=#E9E9E9
| 336237 ||  || — || September 21, 2008 || Kitt Peak || Spacewatch || HEN || align=right | 1.4 km || 
|-id=238 bgcolor=#E9E9E9
| 336238 ||  || — || September 9, 2008 || Kitt Peak || Spacewatch || — || align=right | 1.8 km || 
|-id=239 bgcolor=#E9E9E9
| 336239 ||  || — || September 22, 2008 || Kitt Peak || Spacewatch || — || align=right | 1.4 km || 
|-id=240 bgcolor=#E9E9E9
| 336240 ||  || — || September 22, 2008 || Kitt Peak || Spacewatch || — || align=right | 1.5 km || 
|-id=241 bgcolor=#E9E9E9
| 336241 ||  || — || September 22, 2008 || Kitt Peak || Spacewatch || — || align=right | 1.6 km || 
|-id=242 bgcolor=#E9E9E9
| 336242 ||  || — || September 22, 2008 || Kitt Peak || Spacewatch || — || align=right | 1.3 km || 
|-id=243 bgcolor=#E9E9E9
| 336243 ||  || — || September 22, 2008 || Kitt Peak || Spacewatch || — || align=right | 1.4 km || 
|-id=244 bgcolor=#E9E9E9
| 336244 ||  || — || September 19, 1995 || Kitt Peak || Spacewatch || — || align=right | 1.4 km || 
|-id=245 bgcolor=#E9E9E9
| 336245 ||  || — || September 22, 2008 || Mount Lemmon || Mount Lemmon Survey || — || align=right | 1.5 km || 
|-id=246 bgcolor=#E9E9E9
| 336246 ||  || — || September 22, 2008 || Mount Lemmon || Mount Lemmon Survey || — || align=right | 1.6 km || 
|-id=247 bgcolor=#E9E9E9
| 336247 ||  || — || September 22, 2008 || Mount Lemmon || Mount Lemmon Survey || — || align=right | 2.5 km || 
|-id=248 bgcolor=#E9E9E9
| 336248 ||  || — || September 22, 2008 || Mount Lemmon || Mount Lemmon Survey || — || align=right | 2.8 km || 
|-id=249 bgcolor=#E9E9E9
| 336249 ||  || — || September 22, 2008 || Kitt Peak || Spacewatch || — || align=right | 1.7 km || 
|-id=250 bgcolor=#E9E9E9
| 336250 ||  || — || September 22, 2008 || Kitt Peak || Spacewatch || MRX || align=right | 1.1 km || 
|-id=251 bgcolor=#E9E9E9
| 336251 ||  || — || September 22, 2008 || Kitt Peak || Spacewatch || — || align=right | 1.9 km || 
|-id=252 bgcolor=#E9E9E9
| 336252 ||  || — || September 22, 2008 || Kitt Peak || Spacewatch || — || align=right | 2.0 km || 
|-id=253 bgcolor=#E9E9E9
| 336253 ||  || — || September 23, 2008 || Kitt Peak || Spacewatch || MAR || align=right | 1.7 km || 
|-id=254 bgcolor=#E9E9E9
| 336254 ||  || — || September 24, 2008 || Mount Lemmon || Mount Lemmon Survey || — || align=right | 2.1 km || 
|-id=255 bgcolor=#E9E9E9
| 336255 ||  || — || September 25, 2008 || Goodricke-Pigott || R. A. Tucker || — || align=right | 2.2 km || 
|-id=256 bgcolor=#E9E9E9
| 336256 ||  || — || September 29, 2008 || Dauban || F. Kugel || — || align=right | 1.1 km || 
|-id=257 bgcolor=#E9E9E9
| 336257 ||  || — || September 29, 2008 || Dauban || F. Kugel || AER || align=right | 1.7 km || 
|-id=258 bgcolor=#E9E9E9
| 336258 ||  || — || September 23, 2008 || Socorro || LINEAR || — || align=right | 2.5 km || 
|-id=259 bgcolor=#E9E9E9
| 336259 ||  || — || September 28, 2008 || Socorro || LINEAR || — || align=right | 1.3 km || 
|-id=260 bgcolor=#E9E9E9
| 336260 ||  || — || September 28, 2008 || Socorro || LINEAR || — || align=right | 1.6 km || 
|-id=261 bgcolor=#E9E9E9
| 336261 ||  || — || September 28, 2008 || Socorro || LINEAR || — || align=right | 1.6 km || 
|-id=262 bgcolor=#E9E9E9
| 336262 ||  || — || September 28, 2008 || Socorro || LINEAR || ADE || align=right | 2.2 km || 
|-id=263 bgcolor=#E9E9E9
| 336263 ||  || — || September 28, 2008 || Socorro || LINEAR || — || align=right | 1.6 km || 
|-id=264 bgcolor=#E9E9E9
| 336264 ||  || — || September 28, 2008 || Socorro || LINEAR || — || align=right | 1.6 km || 
|-id=265 bgcolor=#E9E9E9
| 336265 ||  || — || September 22, 2008 || Kitt Peak || Spacewatch || — || align=right | 2.3 km || 
|-id=266 bgcolor=#E9E9E9
| 336266 ||  || — || September 22, 2008 || Catalina || CSS || — || align=right | 2.5 km || 
|-id=267 bgcolor=#E9E9E9
| 336267 ||  || — || September 23, 2008 || Mount Lemmon || Mount Lemmon Survey || — || align=right | 2.1 km || 
|-id=268 bgcolor=#E9E9E9
| 336268 ||  || — || August 24, 2008 || Kitt Peak || Spacewatch || EUN || align=right | 1.6 km || 
|-id=269 bgcolor=#E9E9E9
| 336269 ||  || — || September 25, 2008 || Kitt Peak || Spacewatch || HOF || align=right | 3.2 km || 
|-id=270 bgcolor=#E9E9E9
| 336270 ||  || — || September 25, 2008 || Kitt Peak || Spacewatch || — || align=right | 1.5 km || 
|-id=271 bgcolor=#E9E9E9
| 336271 ||  || — || September 26, 2008 || Kitt Peak || Spacewatch || — || align=right | 1.5 km || 
|-id=272 bgcolor=#E9E9E9
| 336272 ||  || — || September 26, 2008 || Kitt Peak || Spacewatch || — || align=right | 1.8 km || 
|-id=273 bgcolor=#E9E9E9
| 336273 ||  || — || September 30, 2008 || La Sagra || OAM Obs. || — || align=right | 2.8 km || 
|-id=274 bgcolor=#E9E9E9
| 336274 ||  || — || September 26, 2008 || Kitt Peak || Spacewatch || — || align=right | 1.7 km || 
|-id=275 bgcolor=#E9E9E9
| 336275 ||  || — || September 29, 2008 || Mount Lemmon || Mount Lemmon Survey || — || align=right | 1.6 km || 
|-id=276 bgcolor=#E9E9E9
| 336276 ||  || — || September 21, 2008 || Kitt Peak || Spacewatch || — || align=right | 2.5 km || 
|-id=277 bgcolor=#E9E9E9
| 336277 ||  || — || September 29, 2008 || Catalina || CSS || AGN || align=right | 1.6 km || 
|-id=278 bgcolor=#E9E9E9
| 336278 ||  || — || September 29, 2008 || Catalina || CSS || — || align=right | 1.9 km || 
|-id=279 bgcolor=#E9E9E9
| 336279 ||  || — || September 29, 2008 || Catalina || CSS || — || align=right | 1.7 km || 
|-id=280 bgcolor=#E9E9E9
| 336280 ||  || — || September 21, 2008 || Catalina || CSS || INO || align=right | 1.7 km || 
|-id=281 bgcolor=#E9E9E9
| 336281 ||  || — || September 23, 2008 || Mount Lemmon || Mount Lemmon Survey || — || align=right | 1.8 km || 
|-id=282 bgcolor=#E9E9E9
| 336282 ||  || — || September 23, 2008 || Kitt Peak || Spacewatch || — || align=right | 1.3 km || 
|-id=283 bgcolor=#E9E9E9
| 336283 ||  || — || September 23, 2008 || Kitt Peak || Spacewatch || AST || align=right | 1.7 km || 
|-id=284 bgcolor=#E9E9E9
| 336284 ||  || — || September 21, 2008 || Kitt Peak || Spacewatch || — || align=right | 1.7 km || 
|-id=285 bgcolor=#E9E9E9
| 336285 ||  || — || September 21, 2008 || Mount Lemmon || Mount Lemmon Survey || GEF || align=right | 1.3 km || 
|-id=286 bgcolor=#E9E9E9
| 336286 ||  || — || September 28, 2008 || Mount Lemmon || Mount Lemmon Survey || — || align=right | 2.0 km || 
|-id=287 bgcolor=#d6d6d6
| 336287 ||  || — || September 22, 2008 || Kitt Peak || Spacewatch || — || align=right | 3.1 km || 
|-id=288 bgcolor=#E9E9E9
| 336288 ||  || — || September 22, 2008 || Catalina || CSS || — || align=right | 1.9 km || 
|-id=289 bgcolor=#E9E9E9
| 336289 ||  || — || September 25, 2008 || Goodricke-Pigott || R. A. Tucker || KON || align=right | 3.5 km || 
|-id=290 bgcolor=#E9E9E9
| 336290 ||  || — || September 21, 2008 || Kitt Peak || Spacewatch || — || align=right | 2.0 km || 
|-id=291 bgcolor=#E9E9E9
| 336291 ||  || — || September 26, 2008 || Kitt Peak || Spacewatch || HOF || align=right | 2.5 km || 
|-id=292 bgcolor=#E9E9E9
| 336292 ||  || — || September 27, 2008 || Mount Lemmon || Mount Lemmon Survey || — || align=right | 1.9 km || 
|-id=293 bgcolor=#E9E9E9
| 336293 ||  || — || September 27, 2008 || Mount Lemmon || Mount Lemmon Survey || — || align=right | 2.8 km || 
|-id=294 bgcolor=#E9E9E9
| 336294 ||  || — || September 23, 2008 || Catalina || CSS || — || align=right | 2.5 km || 
|-id=295 bgcolor=#E9E9E9
| 336295 ||  || — || September 21, 2008 || Catalina || CSS || ADE || align=right | 2.2 km || 
|-id=296 bgcolor=#E9E9E9
| 336296 ||  || — || September 22, 2008 || Mount Lemmon || Mount Lemmon Survey || WIT || align=right data-sort-value="0.97" | 970 m || 
|-id=297 bgcolor=#E9E9E9
| 336297 ||  || — || September 23, 2008 || Socorro || LINEAR || — || align=right | 1.3 km || 
|-id=298 bgcolor=#E9E9E9
| 336298 ||  || — || September 23, 2008 || Mount Lemmon || Mount Lemmon Survey || — || align=right | 1.9 km || 
|-id=299 bgcolor=#E9E9E9
| 336299 ||  || — || September 30, 2008 || Catalina || CSS || ADE || align=right | 3.1 km || 
|-id=300 bgcolor=#d6d6d6
| 336300 ||  || — || September 24, 2008 || Mount Lemmon || Mount Lemmon Survey || EOS || align=right | 1.8 km || 
|}

336301–336400 

|-bgcolor=#E9E9E9
| 336301 ||  || — || October 2, 2008 || Pla D'Arguines || R. Ferrando || — || align=right | 1.6 km || 
|-id=302 bgcolor=#E9E9E9
| 336302 ||  || — || April 11, 2007 || Siding Spring || SSS || — || align=right | 2.1 km || 
|-id=303 bgcolor=#d6d6d6
| 336303 ||  || — || October 3, 2008 || Hibiscus || N. Teamo || — || align=right | 3.3 km || 
|-id=304 bgcolor=#E9E9E9
| 336304 ||  || — || October 3, 2008 || Socorro || LINEAR || — || align=right | 1.3 km || 
|-id=305 bgcolor=#E9E9E9
| 336305 ||  || — || October 1, 2008 || La Sagra || OAM Obs. || — || align=right | 1.0 km || 
|-id=306 bgcolor=#E9E9E9
| 336306 ||  || — || October 3, 2008 || La Sagra || OAM Obs. || — || align=right | 2.8 km || 
|-id=307 bgcolor=#E9E9E9
| 336307 ||  || — || October 1, 2008 || Mount Lemmon || Mount Lemmon Survey || — || align=right | 1.7 km || 
|-id=308 bgcolor=#E9E9E9
| 336308 ||  || — || March 5, 2006 || Kitt Peak || Spacewatch || HOF || align=right | 3.3 km || 
|-id=309 bgcolor=#E9E9E9
| 336309 ||  || — || October 1, 2008 || Mount Lemmon || Mount Lemmon Survey || BRG || align=right | 1.7 km || 
|-id=310 bgcolor=#d6d6d6
| 336310 ||  || — || October 1, 2008 || Kitt Peak || Spacewatch || KOR || align=right | 1.5 km || 
|-id=311 bgcolor=#E9E9E9
| 336311 ||  || — || October 1, 2008 || Kitt Peak || Spacewatch || — || align=right | 3.0 km || 
|-id=312 bgcolor=#E9E9E9
| 336312 ||  || — || October 1, 2008 || Kitt Peak || Spacewatch || — || align=right | 1.5 km || 
|-id=313 bgcolor=#E9E9E9
| 336313 ||  || — || October 1, 2008 || Mount Lemmon || Mount Lemmon Survey || JUN || align=right | 1.4 km || 
|-id=314 bgcolor=#E9E9E9
| 336314 ||  || — || October 1, 2008 || Mount Lemmon || Mount Lemmon Survey || — || align=right | 2.9 km || 
|-id=315 bgcolor=#E9E9E9
| 336315 ||  || — || October 2, 2008 || Kitt Peak || Spacewatch || — || align=right | 1.0 km || 
|-id=316 bgcolor=#E9E9E9
| 336316 ||  || — || October 2, 2008 || Kitt Peak || Spacewatch || — || align=right | 1.6 km || 
|-id=317 bgcolor=#E9E9E9
| 336317 ||  || — || October 2, 2008 || Kitt Peak || Spacewatch || — || align=right | 2.2 km || 
|-id=318 bgcolor=#E9E9E9
| 336318 ||  || — || October 2, 2008 || Kitt Peak || Spacewatch || — || align=right | 1.7 km || 
|-id=319 bgcolor=#E9E9E9
| 336319 ||  || — || October 2, 2008 || Kitt Peak || Spacewatch || — || align=right | 1.5 km || 
|-id=320 bgcolor=#d6d6d6
| 336320 ||  || — || October 2, 2008 || Kitt Peak || Spacewatch || KAR || align=right | 1.4 km || 
|-id=321 bgcolor=#E9E9E9
| 336321 ||  || — || October 2, 2008 || Kitt Peak || Spacewatch || — || align=right | 1.6 km || 
|-id=322 bgcolor=#E9E9E9
| 336322 ||  || — || October 2, 2008 || Kitt Peak || Spacewatch || ADE || align=right | 1.8 km || 
|-id=323 bgcolor=#E9E9E9
| 336323 ||  || — || September 23, 2008 || Kitt Peak || Spacewatch || AGN || align=right | 1.5 km || 
|-id=324 bgcolor=#E9E9E9
| 336324 ||  || — || October 2, 2008 || Kitt Peak || Spacewatch || — || align=right | 2.0 km || 
|-id=325 bgcolor=#E9E9E9
| 336325 ||  || — || October 2, 2008 || Kitt Peak || Spacewatch || AGN || align=right | 1.3 km || 
|-id=326 bgcolor=#E9E9E9
| 336326 ||  || — || October 2, 2008 || Kitt Peak || Spacewatch || — || align=right | 1.6 km || 
|-id=327 bgcolor=#E9E9E9
| 336327 ||  || — || October 2, 2008 || Mount Lemmon || Mount Lemmon Survey || — || align=right | 1.3 km || 
|-id=328 bgcolor=#E9E9E9
| 336328 ||  || — || October 2, 2008 || Mount Lemmon || Mount Lemmon Survey || JUN || align=right data-sort-value="0.80" | 800 m || 
|-id=329 bgcolor=#E9E9E9
| 336329 ||  || — || October 3, 2008 || Mount Lemmon || Mount Lemmon Survey || — || align=right | 1.6 km || 
|-id=330 bgcolor=#E9E9E9
| 336330 ||  || — || October 3, 2008 || Kitt Peak || Spacewatch || WIT || align=right | 1.1 km || 
|-id=331 bgcolor=#E9E9E9
| 336331 ||  || — || October 3, 2008 || Kitt Peak || Spacewatch || — || align=right | 1.9 km || 
|-id=332 bgcolor=#E9E9E9
| 336332 ||  || — || October 3, 2008 || Kitt Peak || Spacewatch || — || align=right | 1.7 km || 
|-id=333 bgcolor=#E9E9E9
| 336333 ||  || — || October 3, 2008 || Kitt Peak || Spacewatch || HEN || align=right | 1.2 km || 
|-id=334 bgcolor=#E9E9E9
| 336334 ||  || — || October 4, 2008 || La Sagra || OAM Obs. || — || align=right | 2.7 km || 
|-id=335 bgcolor=#E9E9E9
| 336335 ||  || — || October 4, 2008 || La Sagra || OAM Obs. || — || align=right | 1.1 km || 
|-id=336 bgcolor=#E9E9E9
| 336336 ||  || — || October 5, 2008 || La Sagra || OAM Obs. || HEN || align=right | 1.0 km || 
|-id=337 bgcolor=#E9E9E9
| 336337 ||  || — || October 5, 2008 || La Sagra || OAM Obs. || RAF || align=right data-sort-value="0.97" | 970 m || 
|-id=338 bgcolor=#E9E9E9
| 336338 ||  || — || October 6, 2008 || Kitt Peak || Spacewatch || — || align=right | 1.5 km || 
|-id=339 bgcolor=#d6d6d6
| 336339 ||  || — || October 6, 2008 || Kitt Peak || Spacewatch || — || align=right | 3.2 km || 
|-id=340 bgcolor=#E9E9E9
| 336340 ||  || — || October 6, 2008 || Catalina || CSS || EUN || align=right | 2.9 km || 
|-id=341 bgcolor=#E9E9E9
| 336341 ||  || — || October 6, 2008 || Kitt Peak || Spacewatch || GEF || align=right | 1.9 km || 
|-id=342 bgcolor=#E9E9E9
| 336342 ||  || — || October 6, 2008 || Mount Lemmon || Mount Lemmon Survey || — || align=right | 3.2 km || 
|-id=343 bgcolor=#E9E9E9
| 336343 ||  || — || October 6, 2008 || Catalina || CSS || — || align=right | 2.1 km || 
|-id=344 bgcolor=#E9E9E9
| 336344 ||  || — || October 6, 2008 || Kitt Peak || Spacewatch || — || align=right | 1.5 km || 
|-id=345 bgcolor=#E9E9E9
| 336345 ||  || — || February 25, 2006 || Kitt Peak || Spacewatch || AEO || align=right | 2.1 km || 
|-id=346 bgcolor=#E9E9E9
| 336346 ||  || — || October 7, 2008 || Kitt Peak || Spacewatch || — || align=right | 1.6 km || 
|-id=347 bgcolor=#d6d6d6
| 336347 ||  || — || October 7, 2008 || Kitt Peak || Spacewatch || HNA || align=right | 2.6 km || 
|-id=348 bgcolor=#E9E9E9
| 336348 ||  || — || October 8, 2008 || Mount Lemmon || Mount Lemmon Survey || NEM || align=right | 2.5 km || 
|-id=349 bgcolor=#E9E9E9
| 336349 ||  || — || October 8, 2008 || Mount Lemmon || Mount Lemmon Survey || — || align=right | 2.0 km || 
|-id=350 bgcolor=#E9E9E9
| 336350 ||  || — || October 8, 2008 || Mount Lemmon || Mount Lemmon Survey || — || align=right | 2.1 km || 
|-id=351 bgcolor=#E9E9E9
| 336351 ||  || — || October 8, 2008 || Catalina || CSS || HEN || align=right | 1.3 km || 
|-id=352 bgcolor=#E9E9E9
| 336352 ||  || — || October 8, 2008 || Mount Lemmon || Mount Lemmon Survey || — || align=right | 3.1 km || 
|-id=353 bgcolor=#E9E9E9
| 336353 ||  || — || October 1, 2008 || Kitt Peak || Spacewatch || — || align=right | 1.9 km || 
|-id=354 bgcolor=#E9E9E9
| 336354 ||  || — || October 1, 2008 || Catalina || CSS || MAR || align=right | 1.5 km || 
|-id=355 bgcolor=#E9E9E9
| 336355 ||  || — || October 9, 2008 || Kitt Peak || Spacewatch || HEN || align=right | 1.3 km || 
|-id=356 bgcolor=#E9E9E9
| 336356 ||  || — || March 16, 2007 || Kitt Peak || Spacewatch || RAF || align=right | 1.0 km || 
|-id=357 bgcolor=#E9E9E9
| 336357 ||  || — || December 7, 2004 || Socorro || LINEAR || JUN || align=right | 1.3 km || 
|-id=358 bgcolor=#E9E9E9
| 336358 ||  || — || October 2, 2008 || Socorro || LINEAR || EUN || align=right | 1.3 km || 
|-id=359 bgcolor=#E9E9E9
| 336359 ||  || — || October 4, 2008 || La Sagra || OAM Obs. || — || align=right | 3.1 km || 
|-id=360 bgcolor=#E9E9E9
| 336360 ||  || — || October 6, 2008 || Mount Lemmon || Mount Lemmon Survey || NEM || align=right | 2.9 km || 
|-id=361 bgcolor=#E9E9E9
| 336361 || 2008 UT || — || October 19, 2008 || Wildberg || R. Apitzsch || — || align=right | 1.3 km || 
|-id=362 bgcolor=#E9E9E9
| 336362 ||  || — || October 7, 2008 || Catalina || CSS || — || align=right | 2.2 km || 
|-id=363 bgcolor=#d6d6d6
| 336363 ||  || — || October 23, 2008 || Kitt Peak || Spacewatch || — || align=right | 3.0 km || 
|-id=364 bgcolor=#E9E9E9
| 336364 ||  || — || October 20, 2008 || Kitt Peak || Spacewatch || — || align=right | 2.4 km || 
|-id=365 bgcolor=#d6d6d6
| 336365 ||  || — || October 20, 2008 || Kitt Peak || Spacewatch || KOR || align=right | 1.5 km || 
|-id=366 bgcolor=#d6d6d6
| 336366 ||  || — || October 20, 2008 || Kitt Peak || Spacewatch || EUP || align=right | 4.1 km || 
|-id=367 bgcolor=#E9E9E9
| 336367 ||  || — || October 20, 2008 || Mount Lemmon || Mount Lemmon Survey || — || align=right | 2.5 km || 
|-id=368 bgcolor=#E9E9E9
| 336368 ||  || — || October 20, 2008 || Kitt Peak || Spacewatch || GEF || align=right | 1.8 km || 
|-id=369 bgcolor=#d6d6d6
| 336369 ||  || — || October 22, 2003 || Kitt Peak || Spacewatch || — || align=right | 2.3 km || 
|-id=370 bgcolor=#E9E9E9
| 336370 ||  || — || October 20, 2008 || Kitt Peak || Spacewatch || — || align=right | 2.3 km || 
|-id=371 bgcolor=#E9E9E9
| 336371 ||  || — || October 20, 2008 || Kitt Peak || Spacewatch || AGN || align=right | 1.1 km || 
|-id=372 bgcolor=#d6d6d6
| 336372 ||  || — || October 20, 2008 || Kitt Peak || Spacewatch || EOS || align=right | 4.9 km || 
|-id=373 bgcolor=#E9E9E9
| 336373 ||  || — || October 20, 2008 || Kitt Peak || Spacewatch || — || align=right | 2.5 km || 
|-id=374 bgcolor=#E9E9E9
| 336374 ||  || — || October 20, 2008 || Mount Lemmon || Mount Lemmon Survey || — || align=right | 2.0 km || 
|-id=375 bgcolor=#E9E9E9
| 336375 ||  || — || October 20, 2008 || Mount Lemmon || Mount Lemmon Survey || — || align=right | 2.5 km || 
|-id=376 bgcolor=#E9E9E9
| 336376 ||  || — || October 21, 2008 || Kitt Peak || Spacewatch || PAD || align=right | 1.9 km || 
|-id=377 bgcolor=#E9E9E9
| 336377 ||  || — || October 21, 2008 || Kitt Peak || Spacewatch || HOF || align=right | 2.8 km || 
|-id=378 bgcolor=#E9E9E9
| 336378 ||  || — || October 21, 2008 || Kitt Peak || Spacewatch || HEN || align=right | 1.1 km || 
|-id=379 bgcolor=#E9E9E9
| 336379 ||  || — || October 21, 2008 || Kitt Peak || Spacewatch || WIT || align=right | 1.1 km || 
|-id=380 bgcolor=#E9E9E9
| 336380 ||  || — || October 21, 2008 || Kitt Peak || Spacewatch || — || align=right | 2.0 km || 
|-id=381 bgcolor=#E9E9E9
| 336381 ||  || — || October 21, 2008 || Mount Lemmon || Mount Lemmon Survey || — || align=right | 1.8 km || 
|-id=382 bgcolor=#E9E9E9
| 336382 ||  || — || October 21, 2008 || Kitt Peak || Spacewatch || — || align=right | 2.5 km || 
|-id=383 bgcolor=#d6d6d6
| 336383 ||  || — || October 21, 2008 || Kitt Peak || Spacewatch || — || align=right | 3.0 km || 
|-id=384 bgcolor=#E9E9E9
| 336384 ||  || — || October 21, 2008 || Kitt Peak || Spacewatch || — || align=right | 2.7 km || 
|-id=385 bgcolor=#E9E9E9
| 336385 ||  || — || October 21, 2008 || Kitt Peak || Spacewatch || — || align=right | 2.0 km || 
|-id=386 bgcolor=#E9E9E9
| 336386 ||  || — || October 21, 2008 || Kitt Peak || Spacewatch || — || align=right | 2.2 km || 
|-id=387 bgcolor=#d6d6d6
| 336387 ||  || — || October 22, 2008 || Kitt Peak || Spacewatch || — || align=right | 2.9 km || 
|-id=388 bgcolor=#d6d6d6
| 336388 ||  || — || October 23, 2008 || Kitt Peak || Spacewatch || — || align=right | 2.7 km || 
|-id=389 bgcolor=#E9E9E9
| 336389 ||  || — || September 22, 2008 || Kitt Peak || Spacewatch || AGN || align=right | 1.4 km || 
|-id=390 bgcolor=#E9E9E9
| 336390 ||  || — || October 24, 2008 || Mount Lemmon || Mount Lemmon Survey || — || align=right | 1.9 km || 
|-id=391 bgcolor=#E9E9E9
| 336391 ||  || — || September 29, 2008 || Catalina || CSS || — || align=right | 2.6 km || 
|-id=392 bgcolor=#E9E9E9
| 336392 Changhua ||  ||  || October 23, 2008 || Lulin Observatory || X. Y. Hsiao, Q.-z. Ye || — || align=right | 1.8 km || 
|-id=393 bgcolor=#E9E9E9
| 336393 ||  || — || October 27, 2008 || Sierra Stars || W. G. Dillon, D. Wells || — || align=right | 2.1 km || 
|-id=394 bgcolor=#E9E9E9
| 336394 ||  || — || October 7, 2008 || Mount Lemmon || Mount Lemmon Survey || — || align=right | 2.8 km || 
|-id=395 bgcolor=#E9E9E9
| 336395 ||  || — || October 22, 2008 || Kitt Peak || Spacewatch || — || align=right | 2.5 km || 
|-id=396 bgcolor=#E9E9E9
| 336396 ||  || — || October 22, 2008 || Kitt Peak || Spacewatch || — || align=right | 2.5 km || 
|-id=397 bgcolor=#E9E9E9
| 336397 ||  || — || October 22, 2008 || Kitt Peak || Spacewatch || — || align=right | 2.2 km || 
|-id=398 bgcolor=#E9E9E9
| 336398 ||  || — || October 22, 2008 || Kitt Peak || Spacewatch || — || align=right | 2.4 km || 
|-id=399 bgcolor=#E9E9E9
| 336399 ||  || — || October 22, 2008 || Kitt Peak || Spacewatch || — || align=right | 2.2 km || 
|-id=400 bgcolor=#d6d6d6
| 336400 ||  || — || October 23, 2008 || Kitt Peak || Spacewatch || KOR || align=right | 1.5 km || 
|}

336401–336500 

|-bgcolor=#E9E9E9
| 336401 ||  || — || October 23, 2008 || Kitt Peak || Spacewatch || — || align=right | 2.0 km || 
|-id=402 bgcolor=#d6d6d6
| 336402 ||  || — || October 2, 2008 || Mount Lemmon || Mount Lemmon Survey || — || align=right | 3.3 km || 
|-id=403 bgcolor=#E9E9E9
| 336403 ||  || — || October 23, 2008 || Kitt Peak || Spacewatch || — || align=right | 2.4 km || 
|-id=404 bgcolor=#E9E9E9
| 336404 ||  || — || October 23, 2008 || Kitt Peak || Spacewatch || — || align=right | 2.1 km || 
|-id=405 bgcolor=#E9E9E9
| 336405 ||  || — || October 23, 2008 || Mount Lemmon || Mount Lemmon Survey || — || align=right | 2.2 km || 
|-id=406 bgcolor=#E9E9E9
| 336406 ||  || — || October 24, 2008 || Črni Vrh || Črni Vrh || — || align=right | 2.3 km || 
|-id=407 bgcolor=#E9E9E9
| 336407 ||  || — || October 24, 2008 || Kitt Peak || Spacewatch || — || align=right | 2.8 km || 
|-id=408 bgcolor=#E9E9E9
| 336408 ||  || — || October 24, 2008 || Kitt Peak || Spacewatch || MAR || align=right | 1.2 km || 
|-id=409 bgcolor=#E9E9E9
| 336409 ||  || — || October 24, 2008 || Mount Lemmon || Mount Lemmon Survey || — || align=right | 2.2 km || 
|-id=410 bgcolor=#E9E9E9
| 336410 ||  || — || October 24, 2008 || Mount Lemmon || Mount Lemmon Survey || — || align=right | 2.5 km || 
|-id=411 bgcolor=#d6d6d6
| 336411 ||  || — || October 24, 2008 || Catalina || CSS || — || align=right | 4.0 km || 
|-id=412 bgcolor=#d6d6d6
| 336412 ||  || — || October 24, 2008 || Kitt Peak || Spacewatch || URS || align=right | 5.2 km || 
|-id=413 bgcolor=#d6d6d6
| 336413 ||  || — || October 24, 2008 || Kitt Peak || Spacewatch || — || align=right | 2.7 km || 
|-id=414 bgcolor=#E9E9E9
| 336414 ||  || — || October 27, 2008 || Socorro || LINEAR || — || align=right | 3.0 km || 
|-id=415 bgcolor=#E9E9E9
| 336415 ||  || — || October 26, 2008 || Socorro || LINEAR || — || align=right | 1.5 km || 
|-id=416 bgcolor=#E9E9E9
| 336416 ||  || — || October 26, 2008 || Socorro || LINEAR || — || align=right | 1.8 km || 
|-id=417 bgcolor=#E9E9E9
| 336417 ||  || — || October 28, 2008 || Socorro || LINEAR || — || align=right | 1.7 km || 
|-id=418 bgcolor=#E9E9E9
| 336418 ||  || — || September 28, 2008 || Mount Lemmon || Mount Lemmon Survey || — || align=right | 1.4 km || 
|-id=419 bgcolor=#d6d6d6
| 336419 ||  || — || October 23, 2008 || Kitt Peak || Spacewatch || EOS || align=right | 2.2 km || 
|-id=420 bgcolor=#E9E9E9
| 336420 ||  || — || October 23, 2008 || Kitt Peak || Spacewatch || — || align=right | 3.4 km || 
|-id=421 bgcolor=#E9E9E9
| 336421 ||  || — || October 24, 2008 || Catalina || CSS || — || align=right | 2.9 km || 
|-id=422 bgcolor=#E9E9E9
| 336422 ||  || — || October 25, 2008 || Catalina || CSS || — || align=right | 2.1 km || 
|-id=423 bgcolor=#d6d6d6
| 336423 ||  || — || October 25, 2008 || Kitt Peak || Spacewatch || — || align=right | 2.7 km || 
|-id=424 bgcolor=#E9E9E9
| 336424 ||  || — || October 25, 2008 || Kitt Peak || Spacewatch || MRX || align=right | 1.7 km || 
|-id=425 bgcolor=#E9E9E9
| 336425 ||  || — || October 25, 2008 || Catalina || CSS || EUN || align=right | 1.5 km || 
|-id=426 bgcolor=#E9E9E9
| 336426 ||  || — || October 26, 2008 || Mount Lemmon || Mount Lemmon Survey || — || align=right | 2.9 km || 
|-id=427 bgcolor=#d6d6d6
| 336427 ||  || — || October 26, 2008 || Kitt Peak || Spacewatch || — || align=right | 3.3 km || 
|-id=428 bgcolor=#E9E9E9
| 336428 ||  || — || October 26, 2008 || Kitt Peak || Spacewatch || — || align=right | 2.4 km || 
|-id=429 bgcolor=#d6d6d6
| 336429 ||  || — || October 26, 2008 || Kitt Peak || Spacewatch || VER || align=right | 4.1 km || 
|-id=430 bgcolor=#E9E9E9
| 336430 ||  || — || October 26, 2008 || Kitt Peak || Spacewatch || — || align=right | 2.4 km || 
|-id=431 bgcolor=#E9E9E9
| 336431 ||  || — || October 26, 2008 || Kitt Peak || Spacewatch || AGN || align=right | 1.2 km || 
|-id=432 bgcolor=#E9E9E9
| 336432 ||  || — || October 27, 2008 || Kitt Peak || Spacewatch || — || align=right | 2.5 km || 
|-id=433 bgcolor=#E9E9E9
| 336433 ||  || — || October 27, 2008 || Kitt Peak || Spacewatch || AST || align=right | 2.0 km || 
|-id=434 bgcolor=#E9E9E9
| 336434 ||  || — || October 27, 2008 || Kitt Peak || Spacewatch || — || align=right | 1.9 km || 
|-id=435 bgcolor=#E9E9E9
| 336435 ||  || — || October 28, 2008 || Kitt Peak || Spacewatch || HOF || align=right | 2.6 km || 
|-id=436 bgcolor=#E9E9E9
| 336436 ||  || — || October 28, 2008 || Kitt Peak || Spacewatch || — || align=right | 2.1 km || 
|-id=437 bgcolor=#E9E9E9
| 336437 ||  || — || October 28, 2008 || Kitt Peak || Spacewatch || HOF || align=right | 2.6 km || 
|-id=438 bgcolor=#d6d6d6
| 336438 ||  || — || October 28, 2008 || Kitt Peak || Spacewatch || KAR || align=right | 1.1 km || 
|-id=439 bgcolor=#E9E9E9
| 336439 ||  || — || September 29, 2008 || Kitt Peak || Spacewatch || HOF || align=right | 2.8 km || 
|-id=440 bgcolor=#E9E9E9
| 336440 ||  || — || October 29, 2008 || Kitt Peak || Spacewatch || AGN || align=right | 1.3 km || 
|-id=441 bgcolor=#E9E9E9
| 336441 ||  || — || October 29, 2008 || Mount Lemmon || Mount Lemmon Survey || — || align=right | 2.6 km || 
|-id=442 bgcolor=#E9E9E9
| 336442 ||  || — || October 29, 2008 || Kitt Peak || Spacewatch || — || align=right | 2.3 km || 
|-id=443 bgcolor=#E9E9E9
| 336443 ||  || — || October 30, 2008 || Kitt Peak || Spacewatch || — || align=right | 2.2 km || 
|-id=444 bgcolor=#d6d6d6
| 336444 ||  || — || October 30, 2008 || Kitt Peak || Spacewatch || — || align=right | 5.3 km || 
|-id=445 bgcolor=#E9E9E9
| 336445 ||  || — || October 30, 2008 || Kitt Peak || Spacewatch || — || align=right | 3.4 km || 
|-id=446 bgcolor=#E9E9E9
| 336446 ||  || — || October 31, 2008 || Mount Lemmon || Mount Lemmon Survey || — || align=right | 1.4 km || 
|-id=447 bgcolor=#E9E9E9
| 336447 ||  || — || October 31, 2008 || Kitt Peak || Spacewatch || HOF || align=right | 3.0 km || 
|-id=448 bgcolor=#E9E9E9
| 336448 ||  || — || October 31, 2008 || Kitt Peak || Spacewatch || — || align=right | 1.5 km || 
|-id=449 bgcolor=#d6d6d6
| 336449 ||  || — || October 22, 2008 || Kitt Peak || Spacewatch || — || align=right | 3.0 km || 
|-id=450 bgcolor=#d6d6d6
| 336450 ||  || — || October 23, 2008 || Mount Lemmon || Mount Lemmon Survey || EOS || align=right | 5.5 km || 
|-id=451 bgcolor=#d6d6d6
| 336451 ||  || — || October 23, 2008 || Kitt Peak || Spacewatch || — || align=right | 4.4 km || 
|-id=452 bgcolor=#d6d6d6
| 336452 ||  || — || October 26, 2008 || Kitt Peak || Spacewatch || HYG || align=right | 3.3 km || 
|-id=453 bgcolor=#d6d6d6
| 336453 ||  || — || October 28, 2008 || Mount Lemmon || Mount Lemmon Survey || KOR || align=right | 1.1 km || 
|-id=454 bgcolor=#E9E9E9
| 336454 ||  || — || October 28, 2008 || Kitt Peak || Spacewatch || HOF || align=right | 2.7 km || 
|-id=455 bgcolor=#E9E9E9
| 336455 ||  || — || October 28, 2008 || Kitt Peak || Spacewatch || HOF || align=right | 3.5 km || 
|-id=456 bgcolor=#E9E9E9
| 336456 ||  || — || October 25, 2008 || Mount Lemmon || Mount Lemmon Survey || — || align=right | 2.3 km || 
|-id=457 bgcolor=#d6d6d6
| 336457 ||  || — || October 26, 2008 || Kitt Peak || Spacewatch || — || align=right | 5.4 km || 
|-id=458 bgcolor=#d6d6d6
| 336458 ||  || — || October 26, 2008 || Kitt Peak || Spacewatch || — || align=right | 3.4 km || 
|-id=459 bgcolor=#E9E9E9
| 336459 ||  || — || October 29, 2008 || Kitt Peak || Spacewatch || — || align=right | 2.8 km || 
|-id=460 bgcolor=#E9E9E9
| 336460 ||  || — || October 25, 2008 || Catalina || CSS || — || align=right | 1.7 km || 
|-id=461 bgcolor=#d6d6d6
| 336461 ||  || — || October 21, 2008 || Mount Lemmon || Mount Lemmon Survey || — || align=right | 4.3 km || 
|-id=462 bgcolor=#d6d6d6
| 336462 ||  || — || October 23, 2008 || Mount Lemmon || Mount Lemmon Survey || EOS || align=right | 3.6 km || 
|-id=463 bgcolor=#d6d6d6
| 336463 ||  || — || October 25, 2008 || Mount Lemmon || Mount Lemmon Survey || — || align=right | 4.1 km || 
|-id=464 bgcolor=#E9E9E9
| 336464 ||  || — || November 2, 2008 || Socorro || LINEAR || — || align=right | 2.4 km || 
|-id=465 bgcolor=#E9E9E9
| 336465 Deluna ||  ||  || November 4, 2008 || Nazaret || G. Muler, J. M. Ruiz || — || align=right | 3.0 km || 
|-id=466 bgcolor=#d6d6d6
| 336466 ||  || — || November 4, 2008 || Bisei SG Center || BATTeRS || — || align=right | 4.9 km || 
|-id=467 bgcolor=#E9E9E9
| 336467 ||  || — || November 1, 2008 || Catalina || CSS || — || align=right | 3.5 km || 
|-id=468 bgcolor=#E9E9E9
| 336468 ||  || — || November 2, 2008 || Catalina || CSS || — || align=right | 2.4 km || 
|-id=469 bgcolor=#E9E9E9
| 336469 ||  || — || November 2, 2008 || Catalina || CSS || — || align=right | 2.1 km || 
|-id=470 bgcolor=#d6d6d6
| 336470 ||  || — || November 8, 2008 || Andrushivka || Andrushivka Obs. || — || align=right | 4.0 km || 
|-id=471 bgcolor=#E9E9E9
| 336471 ||  || — || November 9, 2008 || La Sagra || OAM Obs. || CLO || align=right | 1.7 km || 
|-id=472 bgcolor=#E9E9E9
| 336472 ||  || — || November 1, 2008 || Mount Lemmon || Mount Lemmon Survey || — || align=right | 2.0 km || 
|-id=473 bgcolor=#d6d6d6
| 336473 ||  || — || November 1, 2008 || Mount Lemmon || Mount Lemmon Survey || K-2 || align=right | 1.4 km || 
|-id=474 bgcolor=#E9E9E9
| 336474 ||  || — || November 1, 2008 || Kitt Peak || Spacewatch || — || align=right | 2.4 km || 
|-id=475 bgcolor=#E9E9E9
| 336475 ||  || — || October 24, 2008 || Kitt Peak || Spacewatch || ADE || align=right | 1.8 km || 
|-id=476 bgcolor=#E9E9E9
| 336476 ||  || — || November 2, 2008 || Kitt Peak || Spacewatch || HOF || align=right | 4.3 km || 
|-id=477 bgcolor=#E9E9E9
| 336477 ||  || — || November 2, 2008 || Kitt Peak || Spacewatch || HOF || align=right | 2.7 km || 
|-id=478 bgcolor=#d6d6d6
| 336478 ||  || — || November 2, 2008 || Kitt Peak || Spacewatch || — || align=right | 5.2 km || 
|-id=479 bgcolor=#E9E9E9
| 336479 ||  || — || November 2, 2008 || Kitt Peak || Spacewatch || AGN || align=right | 1.5 km || 
|-id=480 bgcolor=#E9E9E9
| 336480 ||  || — || November 3, 2008 || Kitt Peak || Spacewatch || DOR || align=right | 2.7 km || 
|-id=481 bgcolor=#d6d6d6
| 336481 ||  || — || November 3, 2008 || Kitt Peak || Spacewatch || VER || align=right | 4.2 km || 
|-id=482 bgcolor=#d6d6d6
| 336482 ||  || — || November 4, 2008 || Kitt Peak || Spacewatch || — || align=right | 3.4 km || 
|-id=483 bgcolor=#E9E9E9
| 336483 ||  || — || November 6, 2008 || Catalina || CSS || — || align=right | 1.8 km || 
|-id=484 bgcolor=#d6d6d6
| 336484 ||  || — || November 6, 2008 || Mount Lemmon || Mount Lemmon Survey || CHA || align=right | 2.1 km || 
|-id=485 bgcolor=#d6d6d6
| 336485 ||  || — || November 6, 2008 || Mount Lemmon || Mount Lemmon Survey || — || align=right | 2.9 km || 
|-id=486 bgcolor=#E9E9E9
| 336486 ||  || — || November 7, 2008 || Mount Lemmon || Mount Lemmon Survey || — || align=right | 2.5 km || 
|-id=487 bgcolor=#E9E9E9
| 336487 ||  || — || November 7, 2008 || Catalina || CSS || — || align=right | 2.7 km || 
|-id=488 bgcolor=#E9E9E9
| 336488 ||  || — || November 10, 2008 || La Sagra || OAM Obs. || — || align=right | 2.0 km || 
|-id=489 bgcolor=#E9E9E9
| 336489 ||  || — || November 17, 2008 || Kitt Peak || Spacewatch || — || align=right | 2.4 km || 
|-id=490 bgcolor=#E9E9E9
| 336490 ||  || — || November 17, 2008 || Kitt Peak || Spacewatch || — || align=right | 2.4 km || 
|-id=491 bgcolor=#E9E9E9
| 336491 ||  || — || November 18, 2008 || Catalina || CSS || — || align=right | 2.4 km || 
|-id=492 bgcolor=#E9E9E9
| 336492 ||  || — || November 18, 2008 || Catalina || CSS || WIT || align=right | 1.2 km || 
|-id=493 bgcolor=#E9E9E9
| 336493 ||  || — || November 17, 2008 || La Sagra || OAM Obs. || — || align=right | 1.6 km || 
|-id=494 bgcolor=#E9E9E9
| 336494 ||  || — || November 17, 2008 || Kitt Peak || Spacewatch || — || align=right | 1.5 km || 
|-id=495 bgcolor=#d6d6d6
| 336495 ||  || — || November 19, 2008 || Mount Lemmon || Mount Lemmon Survey || EOS || align=right | 3.7 km || 
|-id=496 bgcolor=#d6d6d6
| 336496 ||  || — || November 19, 2008 || Mount Lemmon || Mount Lemmon Survey || KOR || align=right | 1.5 km || 
|-id=497 bgcolor=#d6d6d6
| 336497 ||  || — || November 17, 2008 || Kitt Peak || Spacewatch || VER || align=right | 4.0 km || 
|-id=498 bgcolor=#d6d6d6
| 336498 ||  || — || November 18, 2008 || Catalina || CSS || KOR || align=right | 1.5 km || 
|-id=499 bgcolor=#d6d6d6
| 336499 ||  || — || November 19, 2008 || Kitt Peak || Spacewatch || — || align=right | 2.5 km || 
|-id=500 bgcolor=#E9E9E9
| 336500 ||  || — || November 17, 2008 || Kitt Peak || Spacewatch || NEM || align=right | 2.2 km || 
|}

336501–336600 

|-bgcolor=#d6d6d6
| 336501 ||  || — || November 19, 2008 || Kitt Peak || Spacewatch || CHA || align=right | 2.0 km || 
|-id=502 bgcolor=#d6d6d6
| 336502 ||  || — || November 20, 2008 || Mount Lemmon || Mount Lemmon Survey || EOS || align=right | 2.1 km || 
|-id=503 bgcolor=#E9E9E9
| 336503 ||  || — || November 20, 2008 || Kitt Peak || Spacewatch || AEO || align=right | 1.1 km || 
|-id=504 bgcolor=#d6d6d6
| 336504 ||  || — || November 20, 2008 || Kitt Peak || Spacewatch || — || align=right | 5.0 km || 
|-id=505 bgcolor=#d6d6d6
| 336505 ||  || — || November 30, 2008 || Kitt Peak || Spacewatch || URS || align=right | 4.2 km || 
|-id=506 bgcolor=#E9E9E9
| 336506 ||  || — || November 30, 2008 || Mount Lemmon || Mount Lemmon Survey || AGN || align=right | 1.3 km || 
|-id=507 bgcolor=#E9E9E9
| 336507 ||  || — || November 29, 2008 || Bergisch Gladbac || W. Bickel || — || align=right | 1.4 km || 
|-id=508 bgcolor=#d6d6d6
| 336508 ||  || — || November 24, 2008 || Kitt Peak || Spacewatch || EOS || align=right | 2.7 km || 
|-id=509 bgcolor=#d6d6d6
| 336509 ||  || — || November 24, 2008 || Mount Lemmon || Mount Lemmon Survey || ALA || align=right | 4.1 km || 
|-id=510 bgcolor=#d6d6d6
| 336510 ||  || — || November 24, 2008 || Mount Lemmon || Mount Lemmon Survey || TIR || align=right | 3.7 km || 
|-id=511 bgcolor=#E9E9E9
| 336511 ||  || — || November 19, 2008 || Catalina || CSS || EUN || align=right | 1.8 km || 
|-id=512 bgcolor=#E9E9E9
| 336512 ||  || — || November 19, 2008 || Kitt Peak || Spacewatch || — || align=right | 2.8 km || 
|-id=513 bgcolor=#E9E9E9
| 336513 ||  || — || December 1, 2008 || Skylive Obs. || F. Tozzi || — || align=right | 3.1 km || 
|-id=514 bgcolor=#d6d6d6
| 336514 ||  || — || December 4, 2008 || Mount Lemmon || Mount Lemmon Survey || — || align=right | 3.4 km || 
|-id=515 bgcolor=#d6d6d6
| 336515 ||  || — || December 21, 2003 || Socorro || LINEAR || — || align=right | 4.9 km || 
|-id=516 bgcolor=#d6d6d6
| 336516 ||  || — || December 4, 2008 || Mount Lemmon || Mount Lemmon Survey || — || align=right | 3.1 km || 
|-id=517 bgcolor=#E9E9E9
| 336517 ||  || — || December 3, 2008 || Catalina || CSS || IAN || align=right | 1.4 km || 
|-id=518 bgcolor=#d6d6d6
| 336518 ||  || — || December 23, 2008 || Dauban || F. Kugel || — || align=right | 3.4 km || 
|-id=519 bgcolor=#d6d6d6
| 336519 ||  || — || December 20, 2008 || Lulin || LUSS || — || align=right | 4.2 km || 
|-id=520 bgcolor=#d6d6d6
| 336520 ||  || — || December 30, 2008 || Kitt Peak || Spacewatch || — || align=right | 4.5 km || 
|-id=521 bgcolor=#d6d6d6
| 336521 ||  || — || December 31, 2008 || Kitt Peak || Spacewatch || URS || align=right | 5.1 km || 
|-id=522 bgcolor=#E9E9E9
| 336522 ||  || — || December 30, 2008 || Mount Lemmon || Mount Lemmon Survey || EUN || align=right | 1.4 km || 
|-id=523 bgcolor=#d6d6d6
| 336523 ||  || — || December 30, 2008 || Mount Lemmon || Mount Lemmon Survey || HYG || align=right | 2.9 km || 
|-id=524 bgcolor=#d6d6d6
| 336524 ||  || — || December 30, 2008 || Kitt Peak || Spacewatch || — || align=right | 4.3 km || 
|-id=525 bgcolor=#d6d6d6
| 336525 ||  || — || December 29, 2008 || Kitt Peak || Spacewatch || — || align=right | 4.1 km || 
|-id=526 bgcolor=#d6d6d6
| 336526 ||  || — || December 29, 2008 || Kitt Peak || Spacewatch || — || align=right | 4.2 km || 
|-id=527 bgcolor=#d6d6d6
| 336527 ||  || — || December 29, 2008 || Kitt Peak || Spacewatch || — || align=right | 3.9 km || 
|-id=528 bgcolor=#d6d6d6
| 336528 ||  || — || December 29, 2008 || Kitt Peak || Spacewatch || — || align=right | 2.8 km || 
|-id=529 bgcolor=#d6d6d6
| 336529 ||  || — || December 30, 2008 || Kitt Peak || Spacewatch || URS || align=right | 4.1 km || 
|-id=530 bgcolor=#d6d6d6
| 336530 ||  || — || December 30, 2008 || La Sagra || OAM Obs. || TIR || align=right | 3.6 km || 
|-id=531 bgcolor=#d6d6d6
| 336531 ||  || — || December 30, 2008 || Kitt Peak || Spacewatch || — || align=right | 5.0 km || 
|-id=532 bgcolor=#d6d6d6
| 336532 ||  || — || December 21, 2008 || Kitt Peak || Spacewatch || 7:4 || align=right | 3.5 km || 
|-id=533 bgcolor=#d6d6d6
| 336533 ||  || — || December 22, 2008 || Kitt Peak || Spacewatch || — || align=right | 2.9 km || 
|-id=534 bgcolor=#d6d6d6
| 336534 ||  || — || December 30, 2008 || Mount Lemmon || Mount Lemmon Survey || — || align=right | 2.3 km || 
|-id=535 bgcolor=#d6d6d6
| 336535 ||  || — || December 21, 2008 || Kitt Peak || Spacewatch || — || align=right | 3.8 km || 
|-id=536 bgcolor=#d6d6d6
| 336536 ||  || — || January 2, 2009 || Kitt Peak || Spacewatch || HYG || align=right | 2.7 km || 
|-id=537 bgcolor=#d6d6d6
| 336537 ||  || — || January 8, 2009 || Kitt Peak || Spacewatch || — || align=right | 4.5 km || 
|-id=538 bgcolor=#d6d6d6
| 336538 ||  || — || January 15, 2009 || Kitt Peak || Spacewatch || — || align=right | 2.9 km || 
|-id=539 bgcolor=#d6d6d6
| 336539 ||  || — || January 20, 2009 || Bergisch Gladbac || W. Bickel || — || align=right | 3.4 km || 
|-id=540 bgcolor=#d6d6d6
| 336540 ||  || — || January 18, 2009 || Kitt Peak || Spacewatch || — || align=right | 3.7 km || 
|-id=541 bgcolor=#d6d6d6
| 336541 ||  || — || January 16, 2009 || Kitt Peak || Spacewatch || SHU3:2 || align=right | 6.4 km || 
|-id=542 bgcolor=#d6d6d6
| 336542 ||  || — || January 16, 2009 || Kitt Peak || Spacewatch || — || align=right | 3.3 km || 
|-id=543 bgcolor=#d6d6d6
| 336543 ||  || — || October 12, 2007 || Mount Lemmon || Mount Lemmon Survey || — || align=right | 2.9 km || 
|-id=544 bgcolor=#d6d6d6
| 336544 ||  || — || January 20, 2009 || Kitt Peak || Spacewatch || SYL7:4 || align=right | 5.3 km || 
|-id=545 bgcolor=#d6d6d6
| 336545 ||  || — || January 24, 2009 || Purple Mountain || PMO NEO || — || align=right | 2.6 km || 
|-id=546 bgcolor=#d6d6d6
| 336546 ||  || — || January 25, 2009 || Catalina || CSS || — || align=right | 3.9 km || 
|-id=547 bgcolor=#d6d6d6
| 336547 ||  || — || January 30, 2009 || Mount Lemmon || Mount Lemmon Survey || EOS || align=right | 2.7 km || 
|-id=548 bgcolor=#d6d6d6
| 336548 ||  || — || January 30, 2009 || Kitt Peak || Spacewatch || — || align=right | 3.7 km || 
|-id=549 bgcolor=#d6d6d6
| 336549 ||  || — || February 2, 2009 || Kitt Peak || Spacewatch || SHU3:2 || align=right | 5.9 km || 
|-id=550 bgcolor=#d6d6d6
| 336550 ||  || — || February 14, 2009 || Kitt Peak || Spacewatch || — || align=right | 3.9 km || 
|-id=551 bgcolor=#d6d6d6
| 336551 ||  || — || February 14, 2009 || La Sagra || OAM Obs. || — || align=right | 5.8 km || 
|-id=552 bgcolor=#d6d6d6
| 336552 ||  || — || February 16, 2009 || La Sagra || OAM Obs. || — || align=right | 6.2 km || 
|-id=553 bgcolor=#d6d6d6
| 336553 ||  || — || March 1, 2009 || Catalina || CSS || EUP || align=right | 4.4 km || 
|-id=554 bgcolor=#d6d6d6
| 336554 ||  || — || March 26, 2009 || Kitt Peak || Spacewatch || — || align=right | 3.2 km || 
|-id=555 bgcolor=#C2FFFF
| 336555 ||  || — || May 1, 2009 || Kitt Peak || Spacewatch || L5 || align=right | 7.8 km || 
|-id=556 bgcolor=#fefefe
| 336556 ||  || — || May 28, 2009 || Siding Spring || SSS || H || align=right | 1.1 km || 
|-id=557 bgcolor=#fefefe
| 336557 ||  || — || August 15, 2009 || Kitt Peak || Spacewatch || FLO || align=right data-sort-value="0.65" | 650 m || 
|-id=558 bgcolor=#fefefe
| 336558 ||  || — || September 14, 2009 || Kitt Peak || Spacewatch || V || align=right data-sort-value="0.99" | 990 m || 
|-id=559 bgcolor=#fefefe
| 336559 ||  || — || September 15, 2009 || Kitt Peak || Spacewatch || — || align=right data-sort-value="0.72" | 720 m || 
|-id=560 bgcolor=#fefefe
| 336560 ||  || — || September 15, 2009 || Kitt Peak || Spacewatch || — || align=right data-sort-value="0.69" | 690 m || 
|-id=561 bgcolor=#fefefe
| 336561 ||  || — || September 15, 2009 || Kitt Peak || Spacewatch || — || align=right data-sort-value="0.94" | 940 m || 
|-id=562 bgcolor=#fefefe
| 336562 ||  || — || September 17, 2009 || Mount Lemmon || Mount Lemmon Survey || — || align=right data-sort-value="0.58" | 580 m || 
|-id=563 bgcolor=#fefefe
| 336563 ||  || — || September 23, 2009 || Mayhill || A. Lowe || — || align=right data-sort-value="0.75" | 750 m || 
|-id=564 bgcolor=#fefefe
| 336564 ||  || — || September 16, 2009 || Kitt Peak || Spacewatch || — || align=right data-sort-value="0.77" | 770 m || 
|-id=565 bgcolor=#fefefe
| 336565 ||  || — || September 16, 2009 || Kitt Peak || Spacewatch || — || align=right data-sort-value="0.73" | 730 m || 
|-id=566 bgcolor=#fefefe
| 336566 ||  || — || September 17, 2009 || Catalina || CSS || — || align=right | 1.1 km || 
|-id=567 bgcolor=#fefefe
| 336567 ||  || — || August 26, 2009 || Socorro || LINEAR || — || align=right data-sort-value="0.94" | 940 m || 
|-id=568 bgcolor=#fefefe
| 336568 ||  || — || September 17, 2009 || Kitt Peak || Spacewatch || — || align=right data-sort-value="0.77" | 770 m || 
|-id=569 bgcolor=#fefefe
| 336569 ||  || — || September 18, 2009 || Kitt Peak || Spacewatch || — || align=right data-sort-value="0.68" | 680 m || 
|-id=570 bgcolor=#fefefe
| 336570 ||  || — || September 18, 2009 || Kitt Peak || Spacewatch || — || align=right data-sort-value="0.54" | 540 m || 
|-id=571 bgcolor=#fefefe
| 336571 ||  || — || September 18, 2009 || Kitt Peak || Spacewatch || — || align=right | 1.0 km || 
|-id=572 bgcolor=#fefefe
| 336572 ||  || — || September 18, 2009 || Kitt Peak || Spacewatch || — || align=right data-sort-value="0.72" | 720 m || 
|-id=573 bgcolor=#fefefe
| 336573 ||  || — || September 18, 2009 || Kitt Peak || Spacewatch || — || align=right data-sort-value="0.79" | 790 m || 
|-id=574 bgcolor=#fefefe
| 336574 ||  || — || September 18, 2009 || Kitt Peak || Spacewatch || — || align=right data-sort-value="0.86" | 860 m || 
|-id=575 bgcolor=#fefefe
| 336575 ||  || — || September 18, 2009 || Kitt Peak || Spacewatch || — || align=right | 1.2 km || 
|-id=576 bgcolor=#fefefe
| 336576 ||  || — || September 18, 2009 || Kitt Peak || Spacewatch || — || align=right data-sort-value="0.71" | 710 m || 
|-id=577 bgcolor=#fefefe
| 336577 ||  || — || September 20, 2009 || Mount Lemmon || Mount Lemmon Survey || — || align=right data-sort-value="0.55" | 550 m || 
|-id=578 bgcolor=#fefefe
| 336578 ||  || — || January 18, 2004 || Palomar || NEAT || FLO || align=right data-sort-value="0.75" | 750 m || 
|-id=579 bgcolor=#fefefe
| 336579 ||  || — || September 21, 2009 || Kitt Peak || Spacewatch || V || align=right data-sort-value="0.80" | 800 m || 
|-id=580 bgcolor=#fefefe
| 336580 ||  || — || September 21, 2009 || Kitt Peak || Spacewatch || — || align=right data-sort-value="0.80" | 800 m || 
|-id=581 bgcolor=#fefefe
| 336581 ||  || — || September 21, 2009 || Kitt Peak || Spacewatch || NYS || align=right data-sort-value="0.80" | 800 m || 
|-id=582 bgcolor=#fefefe
| 336582 ||  || — || August 31, 2005 || Kitt Peak || Spacewatch || — || align=right | 1.1 km || 
|-id=583 bgcolor=#fefefe
| 336583 ||  || — || September 25, 2009 || Kitt Peak || Spacewatch || — || align=right data-sort-value="0.75" | 750 m || 
|-id=584 bgcolor=#fefefe
| 336584 ||  || — || September 26, 2009 || Kitt Peak || Spacewatch || — || align=right data-sort-value="0.78" | 780 m || 
|-id=585 bgcolor=#d6d6d6
| 336585 ||  || — || September 22, 2009 || Mount Lemmon || Mount Lemmon Survey || URS || align=right | 5.5 km || 
|-id=586 bgcolor=#fefefe
| 336586 ||  || — || September 17, 2009 || Kitt Peak || Spacewatch || — || align=right data-sort-value="0.75" | 750 m || 
|-id=587 bgcolor=#fefefe
| 336587 ||  || — || September 25, 2009 || Kitt Peak || Spacewatch || — || align=right data-sort-value="0.64" | 640 m || 
|-id=588 bgcolor=#fefefe
| 336588 ||  || — || September 21, 2009 || Mount Lemmon || Mount Lemmon Survey || V || align=right data-sort-value="0.72" | 720 m || 
|-id=589 bgcolor=#fefefe
| 336589 ||  || — || September 17, 2009 || Mount Lemmon || Mount Lemmon Survey || — || align=right data-sort-value="0.83" | 830 m || 
|-id=590 bgcolor=#fefefe
| 336590 ||  || — || September 20, 2009 || Mount Lemmon || Mount Lemmon Survey || V || align=right data-sort-value="0.85" | 850 m || 
|-id=591 bgcolor=#fefefe
| 336591 ||  || — || September 28, 2009 || Mount Lemmon || Mount Lemmon Survey || — || align=right data-sort-value="0.83" | 830 m || 
|-id=592 bgcolor=#d6d6d6
| 336592 ||  || — || September 18, 2009 || Kitt Peak || Spacewatch || — || align=right | 4.5 km || 
|-id=593 bgcolor=#fefefe
| 336593 ||  || — || September 28, 2009 || Mount Lemmon || Mount Lemmon Survey || — || align=right data-sort-value="0.95" | 950 m || 
|-id=594 bgcolor=#fefefe
| 336594 ||  || — || October 10, 2009 || La Sagra || OAM Obs. || — || align=right data-sort-value="0.82" | 820 m || 
|-id=595 bgcolor=#fefefe
| 336595 ||  || — || October 14, 2009 || La Sagra || OAM Obs. || FLO || align=right data-sort-value="0.63" | 630 m || 
|-id=596 bgcolor=#fefefe
| 336596 ||  || — || October 10, 2009 || Catalina || CSS || — || align=right data-sort-value="0.91" | 910 m || 
|-id=597 bgcolor=#fefefe
| 336597 ||  || — || October 11, 2009 || Mount Lemmon || Mount Lemmon Survey || — || align=right data-sort-value="0.68" | 680 m || 
|-id=598 bgcolor=#fefefe
| 336598 ||  || — || October 11, 2009 || La Sagra || OAM Obs. || FLO || align=right data-sort-value="0.70" | 700 m || 
|-id=599 bgcolor=#fefefe
| 336599 ||  || — || October 15, 2009 || La Sagra || OAM Obs. || — || align=right | 1.0 km || 
|-id=600 bgcolor=#fefefe
| 336600 ||  || — || May 14, 2008 || Mount Lemmon || Mount Lemmon Survey || FLO || align=right data-sort-value="0.67" | 670 m || 
|}

336601–336700 

|-bgcolor=#fefefe
| 336601 ||  || — || October 14, 2009 || Catalina || CSS || FLO || align=right data-sort-value="0.60" | 600 m || 
|-id=602 bgcolor=#fefefe
| 336602 ||  || — || October 12, 2009 || Mount Lemmon || Mount Lemmon Survey || — || align=right | 1.1 km || 
|-id=603 bgcolor=#fefefe
| 336603 ||  || — || October 2, 2009 || Mount Lemmon || Mount Lemmon Survey || FLO || align=right data-sort-value="0.50" | 500 m || 
|-id=604 bgcolor=#fefefe
| 336604 ||  || — || October 18, 2009 || Vicques || M. Ory || FLO || align=right data-sort-value="0.93" | 930 m || 
|-id=605 bgcolor=#fefefe
| 336605 ||  || — || October 20, 2009 || Vicques || M. Ory || — || align=right | 2.6 km || 
|-id=606 bgcolor=#fefefe
| 336606 ||  || — || October 21, 2009 || Catalina || CSS || — || align=right data-sort-value="0.85" | 850 m || 
|-id=607 bgcolor=#fefefe
| 336607 ||  || — || October 22, 2009 || Mount Lemmon || Mount Lemmon Survey || V || align=right data-sort-value="0.82" | 820 m || 
|-id=608 bgcolor=#fefefe
| 336608 ||  || — || October 22, 2009 || Catalina || CSS || — || align=right | 1.8 km || 
|-id=609 bgcolor=#fefefe
| 336609 ||  || — || August 31, 2005 || Kitt Peak || Spacewatch || — || align=right data-sort-value="0.85" | 850 m || 
|-id=610 bgcolor=#fefefe
| 336610 ||  || — || October 23, 2009 || Mount Lemmon || Mount Lemmon Survey || — || align=right data-sort-value="0.70" | 700 m || 
|-id=611 bgcolor=#fefefe
| 336611 ||  || — || October 24, 2009 || Catalina || CSS || FLO || align=right data-sort-value="0.72" | 720 m || 
|-id=612 bgcolor=#fefefe
| 336612 ||  || — || October 21, 2009 || Kachina || J. Hobart || — || align=right data-sort-value="0.64" | 640 m || 
|-id=613 bgcolor=#fefefe
| 336613 ||  || — || October 22, 2009 || Catalina || CSS || — || align=right data-sort-value="0.80" | 800 m || 
|-id=614 bgcolor=#fefefe
| 336614 ||  || — || October 16, 2009 || Mount Lemmon || Mount Lemmon Survey || NYS || align=right data-sort-value="0.67" | 670 m || 
|-id=615 bgcolor=#E9E9E9
| 336615 ||  || — || November 9, 2009 || Socorro || LINEAR || MIT || align=right | 4.1 km || 
|-id=616 bgcolor=#fefefe
| 336616 ||  || — || November 9, 2009 || Mount Lemmon || Mount Lemmon Survey || — || align=right | 2.2 km || 
|-id=617 bgcolor=#fefefe
| 336617 ||  || — || November 9, 2009 || Catalina || CSS || — || align=right | 1.3 km || 
|-id=618 bgcolor=#E9E9E9
| 336618 ||  || — || November 9, 2009 || Mount Lemmon || Mount Lemmon Survey || ADE || align=right | 2.4 km || 
|-id=619 bgcolor=#fefefe
| 336619 ||  || — || November 8, 2009 || Catalina || CSS || V || align=right data-sort-value="0.61" | 610 m || 
|-id=620 bgcolor=#fefefe
| 336620 ||  || — || November 8, 2009 || Kitt Peak || Spacewatch || — || align=right | 1.2 km || 
|-id=621 bgcolor=#fefefe
| 336621 ||  || — || November 11, 2009 || Socorro || LINEAR || FLO || align=right data-sort-value="0.80" | 800 m || 
|-id=622 bgcolor=#fefefe
| 336622 ||  || — || November 11, 2009 || Kitt Peak || Spacewatch || FLO || align=right data-sort-value="0.91" | 910 m || 
|-id=623 bgcolor=#fefefe
| 336623 ||  || — || December 21, 2006 || Kitt Peak || Spacewatch || — || align=right data-sort-value="0.79" | 790 m || 
|-id=624 bgcolor=#fefefe
| 336624 ||  || — || November 11, 2009 || Kitt Peak || Spacewatch || FLO || align=right data-sort-value="0.70" | 700 m || 
|-id=625 bgcolor=#fefefe
| 336625 ||  || — || November 15, 2009 || Catalina || CSS || — || align=right data-sort-value="0.97" | 970 m || 
|-id=626 bgcolor=#E9E9E9
| 336626 ||  || — || October 26, 2009 || Mount Lemmon || Mount Lemmon Survey || — || align=right | 2.2 km || 
|-id=627 bgcolor=#fefefe
| 336627 ||  || — || November 9, 2009 || Kitt Peak || Spacewatch || FLO || align=right data-sort-value="0.63" | 630 m || 
|-id=628 bgcolor=#fefefe
| 336628 ||  || — || November 12, 2009 || La Sagra || OAM Obs. || — || align=right | 1.8 km || 
|-id=629 bgcolor=#E9E9E9
| 336629 ||  || — || November 10, 2009 || Kitt Peak || Spacewatch || — || align=right | 1.3 km || 
|-id=630 bgcolor=#E9E9E9
| 336630 ||  || — || November 11, 2009 || Mount Lemmon || Mount Lemmon Survey || EUN || align=right | 1.4 km || 
|-id=631 bgcolor=#fefefe
| 336631 ||  || — || November 11, 2009 || Mount Lemmon || Mount Lemmon Survey || V || align=right data-sort-value="0.81" | 810 m || 
|-id=632 bgcolor=#fefefe
| 336632 ||  || — || November 10, 2009 || La Sagra || OAM Obs. || — || align=right data-sort-value="0.98" | 980 m || 
|-id=633 bgcolor=#fefefe
| 336633 ||  || — || November 11, 2009 || Mount Lemmon || Mount Lemmon Survey || — || align=right data-sort-value="0.99" | 990 m || 
|-id=634 bgcolor=#fefefe
| 336634 ||  || — || November 17, 2009 || Mount Lemmon || Mount Lemmon Survey || V || align=right data-sort-value="0.66" | 660 m || 
|-id=635 bgcolor=#fefefe
| 336635 ||  || — || November 17, 2009 || Mount Lemmon || Mount Lemmon Survey || — || align=right | 1.2 km || 
|-id=636 bgcolor=#fefefe
| 336636 ||  || — || November 16, 2009 || Kitt Peak || Spacewatch || — || align=right data-sort-value="0.69" | 690 m || 
|-id=637 bgcolor=#fefefe
| 336637 ||  || — || November 16, 2009 || La Sagra || OAM Obs. || V || align=right data-sort-value="0.77" | 770 m || 
|-id=638 bgcolor=#fefefe
| 336638 ||  || — || November 17, 2009 || Kitt Peak || Spacewatch || MAS || align=right data-sort-value="0.69" | 690 m || 
|-id=639 bgcolor=#E9E9E9
| 336639 ||  || — || November 17, 2009 || Mount Lemmon || Mount Lemmon Survey || — || align=right | 2.1 km || 
|-id=640 bgcolor=#fefefe
| 336640 ||  || — || November 18, 2009 || Kitt Peak || Spacewatch || V || align=right data-sort-value="0.91" | 910 m || 
|-id=641 bgcolor=#fefefe
| 336641 ||  || — || November 18, 2009 || Kitt Peak || Spacewatch || FLO || align=right data-sort-value="0.56" | 560 m || 
|-id=642 bgcolor=#E9E9E9
| 336642 ||  || — || November 18, 2009 || Kitt Peak || Spacewatch || — || align=right data-sort-value="0.96" | 960 m || 
|-id=643 bgcolor=#fefefe
| 336643 ||  || — || November 19, 2009 || Kitt Peak || Spacewatch || V || align=right data-sort-value="0.84" | 840 m || 
|-id=644 bgcolor=#fefefe
| 336644 ||  || — || November 21, 2009 || Kitt Peak || Spacewatch || FLO || align=right data-sort-value="0.64" | 640 m || 
|-id=645 bgcolor=#fefefe
| 336645 ||  || — || November 20, 2009 || Kitt Peak || Spacewatch || — || align=right data-sort-value="0.84" | 840 m || 
|-id=646 bgcolor=#fefefe
| 336646 ||  || — || November 21, 2009 || Kitt Peak || Spacewatch || — || align=right | 1.1 km || 
|-id=647 bgcolor=#fefefe
| 336647 ||  || — || November 21, 2009 || Kitt Peak || Spacewatch || — || align=right data-sort-value="0.82" | 820 m || 
|-id=648 bgcolor=#fefefe
| 336648 ||  || — || December 14, 2002 || Apache Point || SDSS || — || align=right data-sort-value="0.94" | 940 m || 
|-id=649 bgcolor=#fefefe
| 336649 ||  || — || November 17, 2009 || Kitt Peak || Spacewatch || NYS || align=right data-sort-value="0.53" | 530 m || 
|-id=650 bgcolor=#fefefe
| 336650 ||  || — || November 17, 2009 || Catalina || CSS || FLO || align=right data-sort-value="0.77" | 770 m || 
|-id=651 bgcolor=#E9E9E9
| 336651 ||  || — || November 18, 2009 || Mount Lemmon || Mount Lemmon Survey || — || align=right | 2.8 km || 
|-id=652 bgcolor=#E9E9E9
| 336652 ||  || — || November 21, 2009 || Mount Lemmon || Mount Lemmon Survey || JUN || align=right | 1.4 km || 
|-id=653 bgcolor=#fefefe
| 336653 ||  || — || November 21, 2009 || Mount Lemmon || Mount Lemmon Survey || NYS || align=right data-sort-value="0.66" | 660 m || 
|-id=654 bgcolor=#fefefe
| 336654 ||  || — || December 12, 2009 || Mayhill || iTelescope Obs. || NYS || align=right data-sort-value="0.78" | 780 m || 
|-id=655 bgcolor=#E9E9E9
| 336655 ||  || — || December 9, 2009 || Socorro || LINEAR || — || align=right | 1.5 km || 
|-id=656 bgcolor=#E9E9E9
| 336656 ||  || — || December 15, 2009 || Mount Lemmon || Mount Lemmon Survey || — || align=right | 2.7 km || 
|-id=657 bgcolor=#E9E9E9
| 336657 ||  || — || December 15, 2009 || Mount Lemmon || Mount Lemmon Survey || — || align=right | 2.9 km || 
|-id=658 bgcolor=#E9E9E9
| 336658 ||  || — || September 18, 2009 || Kitt Peak || Spacewatch || — || align=right | 2.1 km || 
|-id=659 bgcolor=#d6d6d6
| 336659 ||  || — || November 10, 2009 || Mount Lemmon || Mount Lemmon Survey || — || align=right | 3.4 km || 
|-id=660 bgcolor=#E9E9E9
| 336660 ||  || — || December 12, 2009 || Socorro || LINEAR || EUN || align=right | 2.0 km || 
|-id=661 bgcolor=#FA8072
| 336661 ||  || — || December 13, 2009 || Socorro || LINEAR || — || align=right data-sort-value="0.89" | 890 m || 
|-id=662 bgcolor=#fefefe
| 336662 ||  || — || December 15, 2009 || Socorro || LINEAR || — || align=right | 1.1 km || 
|-id=663 bgcolor=#E9E9E9
| 336663 ||  || — || September 5, 2008 || Kitt Peak || Spacewatch || — || align=right | 1.7 km || 
|-id=664 bgcolor=#d6d6d6
| 336664 ||  || — || December 18, 2009 || Mount Lemmon || Mount Lemmon Survey || — || align=right | 4.4 km || 
|-id=665 bgcolor=#d6d6d6
| 336665 ||  || — || September 28, 2009 || Kitt Peak || Spacewatch || — || align=right | 4.2 km || 
|-id=666 bgcolor=#d6d6d6
| 336666 ||  || — || December 20, 2009 || Kitt Peak || Spacewatch || — || align=right | 4.6 km || 
|-id=667 bgcolor=#E9E9E9
| 336667 ||  || — || December 25, 2009 || Kitt Peak || Spacewatch || — || align=right | 2.9 km || 
|-id=668 bgcolor=#E9E9E9
| 336668 ||  || — || December 18, 2009 || Mount Lemmon || Mount Lemmon Survey || HEN || align=right | 1.3 km || 
|-id=669 bgcolor=#fefefe
| 336669 ||  || — || December 18, 2009 || Mount Lemmon || Mount Lemmon Survey || V || align=right data-sort-value="0.76" | 760 m || 
|-id=670 bgcolor=#fefefe
| 336670 ||  || — || December 19, 2009 || Kitt Peak || Spacewatch || — || align=right | 1.3 km || 
|-id=671 bgcolor=#d6d6d6
| 336671 ||  || — || December 18, 2009 || Mount Lemmon || Mount Lemmon Survey || ALA || align=right | 3.7 km || 
|-id=672 bgcolor=#E9E9E9
| 336672 ||  || — || January 6, 2010 || Kitt Peak || Spacewatch || — || align=right | 4.2 km || 
|-id=673 bgcolor=#E9E9E9
| 336673 ||  || — || January 7, 2010 || Mount Lemmon || Mount Lemmon Survey || AER || align=right | 1.8 km || 
|-id=674 bgcolor=#d6d6d6
| 336674 ||  || — || January 6, 2010 || Kitt Peak || Spacewatch || — || align=right | 4.7 km || 
|-id=675 bgcolor=#E9E9E9
| 336675 ||  || — || February 24, 2006 || Kitt Peak || Spacewatch || NEM || align=right | 2.2 km || 
|-id=676 bgcolor=#E9E9E9
| 336676 ||  || — || January 6, 2010 || Kitt Peak || Spacewatch || — || align=right | 1.1 km || 
|-id=677 bgcolor=#fefefe
| 336677 ||  || — || January 6, 2010 || Kitt Peak || Spacewatch || — || align=right data-sort-value="0.77" | 770 m || 
|-id=678 bgcolor=#E9E9E9
| 336678 ||  || — || January 7, 2010 || Kitt Peak || Spacewatch || AEO || align=right | 1.4 km || 
|-id=679 bgcolor=#E9E9E9
| 336679 ||  || — || January 10, 2010 || Málaga || Málaga Obs. || BAR || align=right | 1.8 km || 
|-id=680 bgcolor=#fefefe
| 336680 Pavolpaulík ||  ||  || January 10, 2010 || Mayhill || S. Kürti || — || align=right data-sort-value="0.97" | 970 m || 
|-id=681 bgcolor=#d6d6d6
| 336681 ||  || — || January 7, 2010 || Kitt Peak || Spacewatch || — || align=right | 3.8 km || 
|-id=682 bgcolor=#E9E9E9
| 336682 ||  || — || January 7, 2010 || Kitt Peak || Spacewatch || KON || align=right | 3.0 km || 
|-id=683 bgcolor=#E9E9E9
| 336683 ||  || — || January 8, 2010 || Kitt Peak || Spacewatch || — || align=right data-sort-value="0.98" | 980 m || 
|-id=684 bgcolor=#d6d6d6
| 336684 ||  || — || January 8, 2010 || Kitt Peak || Spacewatch || — || align=right | 3.1 km || 
|-id=685 bgcolor=#E9E9E9
| 336685 ||  || — || January 6, 2010 || Catalina || CSS || — || align=right | 2.4 km || 
|-id=686 bgcolor=#E9E9E9
| 336686 ||  || — || January 6, 2010 || Catalina || CSS || — || align=right | 2.4 km || 
|-id=687 bgcolor=#E9E9E9
| 336687 ||  || — || January 10, 2010 || Kitt Peak || Spacewatch || — || align=right | 2.4 km || 
|-id=688 bgcolor=#d6d6d6
| 336688 ||  || — || November 3, 2008 || Mount Lemmon || Mount Lemmon Survey || — || align=right | 2.8 km || 
|-id=689 bgcolor=#E9E9E9
| 336689 ||  || — || January 13, 2010 || Mount Lemmon || Mount Lemmon Survey || — || align=right | 2.4 km || 
|-id=690 bgcolor=#fefefe
| 336690 ||  || — || January 7, 2010 || Socorro || LINEAR || ERI || align=right | 2.4 km || 
|-id=691 bgcolor=#d6d6d6
| 336691 ||  || — || January 13, 2010 || Mount Lemmon || Mount Lemmon Survey || — || align=right | 4.1 km || 
|-id=692 bgcolor=#d6d6d6
| 336692 ||  || — || January 8, 2010 || Kitt Peak || Spacewatch || — || align=right | 5.5 km || 
|-id=693 bgcolor=#E9E9E9
| 336693 ||  || — || January 12, 2010 || Mount Lemmon || Mount Lemmon Survey || ADE || align=right | 3.5 km || 
|-id=694 bgcolor=#d6d6d6
| 336694 Fey ||  ||  || January 8, 2010 || WISE || WISE || VER || align=right | 4.4 km || 
|-id=695 bgcolor=#d6d6d6
| 336695 ||  || — || May 3, 2005 || Kitt Peak || Spacewatch || — || align=right | 4.3 km || 
|-id=696 bgcolor=#E9E9E9
| 336696 ||  || — || January 18, 2010 || Dauban || F. Kugel || GEF || align=right | 1.5 km || 
|-id=697 bgcolor=#d6d6d6
| 336697 ||  || — || January 20, 2010 || WISE || WISE || — || align=right | 4.7 km || 
|-id=698 bgcolor=#d6d6d6
| 336698 Melbourne || 2010 CJ ||  || February 5, 2010 || Tzec Maun || E. Schwab || — || align=right | 4.3 km || 
|-id=699 bgcolor=#d6d6d6
| 336699 ||  || — || February 6, 2010 || Socorro || LINEAR || ALA || align=right | 5.0 km || 
|-id=700 bgcolor=#d6d6d6
| 336700 ||  || — || December 20, 2004 || Mount Lemmon || Mount Lemmon Survey || — || align=right | 4.1 km || 
|}

336701–336800 

|-bgcolor=#E9E9E9
| 336701 ||  || — || February 10, 2010 || Kitt Peak || Spacewatch || PAD || align=right | 2.7 km || 
|-id=702 bgcolor=#d6d6d6
| 336702 ||  || — || February 13, 2010 || Mount Lemmon || Mount Lemmon Survey || HYG || align=right | 3.4 km || 
|-id=703 bgcolor=#d6d6d6
| 336703 ||  || — || December 20, 2009 || Mount Lemmon || Mount Lemmon Survey || URS || align=right | 5.2 km || 
|-id=704 bgcolor=#E9E9E9
| 336704 ||  || — || February 5, 2010 || Catalina || CSS || EUN || align=right | 2.8 km || 
|-id=705 bgcolor=#E9E9E9
| 336705 ||  || — || February 12, 2010 || Socorro || LINEAR || — || align=right | 2.2 km || 
|-id=706 bgcolor=#d6d6d6
| 336706 ||  || — || January 27, 2004 || Anderson Mesa || LONEOS || — || align=right | 4.8 km || 
|-id=707 bgcolor=#E9E9E9
| 336707 ||  || — || August 26, 2008 || La Sagra || OAM Obs. || EUN || align=right | 1.3 km || 
|-id=708 bgcolor=#E9E9E9
| 336708 ||  || — || February 16, 2001 || Kitt Peak || Spacewatch || — || align=right | 2.3 km || 
|-id=709 bgcolor=#d6d6d6
| 336709 ||  || — || February 14, 2010 || Kitt Peak || Spacewatch || THM || align=right | 3.7 km || 
|-id=710 bgcolor=#E9E9E9
| 336710 ||  || — || February 14, 2010 || Kitt Peak || Spacewatch || NEM || align=right | 2.5 km || 
|-id=711 bgcolor=#E9E9E9
| 336711 ||  || — || March 24, 2006 || Kitt Peak || Spacewatch || — || align=right | 2.2 km || 
|-id=712 bgcolor=#d6d6d6
| 336712 ||  || — || February 15, 2010 || Catalina || CSS || — || align=right | 5.6 km || 
|-id=713 bgcolor=#d6d6d6
| 336713 ||  || — || February 15, 2010 || Kitt Peak || Spacewatch || SYL7:4 || align=right | 5.7 km || 
|-id=714 bgcolor=#d6d6d6
| 336714 ||  || — || February 15, 2010 || Kitt Peak || Spacewatch || HYG || align=right | 4.7 km || 
|-id=715 bgcolor=#E9E9E9
| 336715 ||  || — || February 13, 2010 || Catalina || CSS || — || align=right | 2.9 km || 
|-id=716 bgcolor=#d6d6d6
| 336716 ||  || — || August 10, 2007 || Kitt Peak || Spacewatch || — || align=right | 3.0 km || 
|-id=717 bgcolor=#d6d6d6
| 336717 ||  || — || September 11, 2007 || Kitt Peak || Spacewatch || — || align=right | 3.1 km || 
|-id=718 bgcolor=#d6d6d6
| 336718 ||  || — || November 19, 2009 || Mount Lemmon || Mount Lemmon Survey || TRE || align=right | 3.6 km || 
|-id=719 bgcolor=#E9E9E9
| 336719 ||  || — || September 30, 2003 || Kitt Peak || Spacewatch || HOF || align=right | 3.6 km || 
|-id=720 bgcolor=#d6d6d6
| 336720 ||  || — || February 15, 2010 || Kitt Peak || Spacewatch || — || align=right | 2.9 km || 
|-id=721 bgcolor=#d6d6d6
| 336721 ||  || — || February 15, 2010 || Kitt Peak || Spacewatch || — || align=right | 3.2 km || 
|-id=722 bgcolor=#E9E9E9
| 336722 ||  || — || January 22, 2006 || Mount Lemmon || Mount Lemmon Survey || — || align=right | 2.3 km || 
|-id=723 bgcolor=#E9E9E9
| 336723 ||  || — || September 4, 2003 || Kitt Peak || Spacewatch || — || align=right | 2.4 km || 
|-id=724 bgcolor=#d6d6d6
| 336724 ||  || — || February 16, 2010 || Kitt Peak || Spacewatch || VER || align=right | 4.6 km || 
|-id=725 bgcolor=#d6d6d6
| 336725 ||  || — || February 20, 2010 || WISE || WISE || — || align=right | 4.9 km || 
|-id=726 bgcolor=#E9E9E9
| 336726 ||  || — || January 28, 1998 || Kitt Peak || Spacewatch || — || align=right data-sort-value="0.97" | 970 m || 
|-id=727 bgcolor=#d6d6d6
| 336727 ||  || — || February 17, 2010 || Kitt Peak || Spacewatch || — || align=right | 3.0 km || 
|-id=728 bgcolor=#d6d6d6
| 336728 ||  || — || September 12, 2001 || Kitt Peak || Spacewatch || EOS || align=right | 2.0 km || 
|-id=729 bgcolor=#fefefe
| 336729 ||  || — || December 28, 2005 || Mount Lemmon || Mount Lemmon Survey || MAS || align=right data-sort-value="0.86" | 860 m || 
|-id=730 bgcolor=#d6d6d6
| 336730 ||  || — || February 18, 2010 || Mount Lemmon || Mount Lemmon Survey || — || align=right | 3.7 km || 
|-id=731 bgcolor=#d6d6d6
| 336731 ||  || — || February 16, 2010 || Catalina || CSS || — || align=right | 3.5 km || 
|-id=732 bgcolor=#E9E9E9
| 336732 ||  || — || August 7, 2004 || Siding Spring || SSS || — || align=right | 3.7 km || 
|-id=733 bgcolor=#d6d6d6
| 336733 ||  || — || March 9, 2010 || Jarnac || Jarnac Obs. || HYG || align=right | 3.9 km || 
|-id=734 bgcolor=#d6d6d6
| 336734 ||  || — || March 20, 1999 || Apache Point || SDSS || — || align=right | 3.7 km || 
|-id=735 bgcolor=#d6d6d6
| 336735 ||  || — || March 11, 2010 || Siding Spring || SSS || EUP || align=right | 5.7 km || 
|-id=736 bgcolor=#d6d6d6
| 336736 ||  || — || March 14, 2010 || Dauban || F. Kugel || ANF || align=right | 2.0 km || 
|-id=737 bgcolor=#E9E9E9
| 336737 ||  || — || April 19, 2006 || Kitt Peak || Spacewatch || — || align=right | 2.3 km || 
|-id=738 bgcolor=#d6d6d6
| 336738 ||  || — || October 9, 2007 || Kitt Peak || Spacewatch || HYG || align=right | 3.3 km || 
|-id=739 bgcolor=#d6d6d6
| 336739 ||  || — || March 13, 2010 || Catalina || CSS || EOS || align=right | 3.4 km || 
|-id=740 bgcolor=#d6d6d6
| 336740 ||  || — || March 13, 2010 || Kitt Peak || Spacewatch || — || align=right | 4.7 km || 
|-id=741 bgcolor=#d6d6d6
| 336741 ||  || — || June 13, 2005 || Kitt Peak || Spacewatch || — || align=right | 3.6 km || 
|-id=742 bgcolor=#d6d6d6
| 336742 ||  || — || March 12, 2010 || Kitt Peak || Spacewatch || EOS || align=right | 2.4 km || 
|-id=743 bgcolor=#d6d6d6
| 336743 ||  || — || March 18, 2010 || Kitt Peak || Spacewatch || — || align=right | 3.3 km || 
|-id=744 bgcolor=#d6d6d6
| 336744 ||  || — || March 18, 2010 || Mount Lemmon || Mount Lemmon Survey || — || align=right | 3.8 km || 
|-id=745 bgcolor=#d6d6d6
| 336745 ||  || — || April 14, 2005 || Kitt Peak || Spacewatch || EOS || align=right | 2.0 km || 
|-id=746 bgcolor=#d6d6d6
| 336746 ||  || — || May 4, 2005 || Kitt Peak || Spacewatch || — || align=right | 2.8 km || 
|-id=747 bgcolor=#d6d6d6
| 336747 ||  || — || March 25, 2010 || Kitt Peak || Spacewatch || EOS || align=right | 2.5 km || 
|-id=748 bgcolor=#d6d6d6
| 336748 ||  || — || March 25, 2010 || Kitt Peak || Spacewatch || EOS || align=right | 1.9 km || 
|-id=749 bgcolor=#E9E9E9
| 336749 ||  || — || September 18, 2003 || Kitt Peak || Spacewatch || — || align=right | 1.6 km || 
|-id=750 bgcolor=#d6d6d6
| 336750 ||  || — || September 4, 2007 || Mount Lemmon || Mount Lemmon Survey || THM || align=right | 2.3 km || 
|-id=751 bgcolor=#d6d6d6
| 336751 ||  || — || April 10, 2010 || Mount Lemmon || Mount Lemmon Survey || — || align=right | 4.2 km || 
|-id=752 bgcolor=#E9E9E9
| 336752 ||  || — || September 7, 2000 || Kitt Peak || Spacewatch || KON || align=right | 2.6 km || 
|-id=753 bgcolor=#d6d6d6
| 336753 ||  || — || April 28, 2010 || WISE || WISE || — || align=right | 4.4 km || 
|-id=754 bgcolor=#d6d6d6
| 336754 ||  || — || May 23, 2010 || WISE || WISE || SHU3:2 || align=right | 4.7 km || 
|-id=755 bgcolor=#d6d6d6
| 336755 ||  || — || May 27, 2010 || WISE || WISE || EOS || align=right | 3.5 km || 
|-id=756 bgcolor=#C2E0FF
| 336756 ||  || — || July 1, 2010 || WISE || WISE || centaurdamocloidcritical || align=right | 44 km || 
|-id=757 bgcolor=#FA8072
| 336757 ||  || — || March 19, 2004 || Siding Spring || SSS || H || align=right data-sort-value="0.85" | 850 m || 
|-id=758 bgcolor=#E9E9E9
| 336758 ||  || — || August 18, 2010 || Purple Mountain || PMO NEO || — || align=right | 2.7 km || 
|-id=759 bgcolor=#E9E9E9
| 336759 ||  || — || March 8, 2008 || Kitt Peak || Spacewatch || — || align=right | 2.1 km || 
|-id=760 bgcolor=#E9E9E9
| 336760 ||  || — || April 4, 2008 || Kitt Peak || Spacewatch || — || align=right | 2.0 km || 
|-id=761 bgcolor=#fefefe
| 336761 ||  || — || November 11, 2007 || Siding Spring || SSS || H || align=right data-sort-value="0.81" | 810 m || 
|-id=762 bgcolor=#fefefe
| 336762 ||  || — || December 31, 1997 || Chichibu || N. Satō || H || align=right data-sort-value="0.81" | 810 m || 
|-id=763 bgcolor=#fefefe
| 336763 ||  || — || February 17, 2004 || Socorro || LINEAR || FLO || align=right data-sort-value="0.91" | 910 m || 
|-id=764 bgcolor=#fefefe
| 336764 ||  || — || March 1, 2004 || Kitt Peak || Spacewatch || MAS || align=right data-sort-value="0.76" | 760 m || 
|-id=765 bgcolor=#E9E9E9
| 336765 ||  || — || September 25, 2003 || Palomar || NEAT || — || align=right | 3.1 km || 
|-id=766 bgcolor=#E9E9E9
| 336766 ||  || — || October 22, 2006 || Mount Lemmon || Mount Lemmon Survey || — || align=right | 1.7 km || 
|-id=767 bgcolor=#fefefe
| 336767 ||  || — || March 21, 1993 || La Silla || UESAC || NYS || align=right data-sort-value="0.65" | 650 m || 
|-id=768 bgcolor=#fefefe
| 336768 ||  || — || October 11, 1996 || Kitt Peak || Spacewatch || — || align=right data-sort-value="0.80" | 800 m || 
|-id=769 bgcolor=#fefefe
| 336769 ||  || — || December 30, 1999 || Socorro || LINEAR || H || align=right data-sort-value="0.75" | 750 m || 
|-id=770 bgcolor=#fefefe
| 336770 ||  || — || January 15, 2007 || Anderson Mesa || LONEOS || — || align=right | 1.3 km || 
|-id=771 bgcolor=#fefefe
| 336771 ||  || — || January 5, 2006 || Kitt Peak || Spacewatch || H || align=right data-sort-value="0.83" | 830 m || 
|-id=772 bgcolor=#fefefe
| 336772 ||  || — || February 11, 2004 || Palomar || NEAT || — || align=right data-sort-value="0.92" | 920 m || 
|-id=773 bgcolor=#fefefe
| 336773 ||  || — || February 19, 2001 || Socorro || LINEAR || — || align=right | 1.1 km || 
|-id=774 bgcolor=#d6d6d6
| 336774 ||  || — || March 12, 2010 || WISE || WISE || — || align=right | 4.8 km || 
|-id=775 bgcolor=#fefefe
| 336775 ||  || — || August 29, 2005 || Palomar || NEAT || — || align=right | 1.1 km || 
|-id=776 bgcolor=#fefefe
| 336776 ||  || — || December 9, 2006 || Kitt Peak || Spacewatch || — || align=right | 1.6 km || 
|-id=777 bgcolor=#E9E9E9
| 336777 ||  || — || August 25, 2004 || Kitt Peak || Spacewatch || — || align=right | 1.9 km || 
|-id=778 bgcolor=#fefefe
| 336778 ||  || — || February 12, 2008 || Mount Lemmon || Mount Lemmon Survey || — || align=right data-sort-value="0.85" | 850 m || 
|-id=779 bgcolor=#fefefe
| 336779 ||  || — || September 16, 2009 || Mount Lemmon || Mount Lemmon Survey || — || align=right data-sort-value="0.92" | 920 m || 
|-id=780 bgcolor=#fefefe
| 336780 ||  || — || August 16, 2002 || Palomar || NEAT || — || align=right data-sort-value="0.72" | 720 m || 
|-id=781 bgcolor=#fefefe
| 336781 ||  || — || April 5, 2008 || Kitt Peak || Spacewatch || MAS || align=right data-sort-value="0.75" | 750 m || 
|-id=782 bgcolor=#fefefe
| 336782 ||  || — || March 22, 2004 || Socorro || LINEAR || — || align=right | 1.2 km || 
|-id=783 bgcolor=#fefefe
| 336783 ||  || — || September 29, 2005 || Mount Lemmon || Mount Lemmon Survey || EUT || align=right data-sort-value="0.87" | 870 m || 
|-id=784 bgcolor=#fefefe
| 336784 ||  || — || December 24, 2006 || Kitt Peak || Spacewatch || — || align=right | 1.2 km || 
|-id=785 bgcolor=#E9E9E9
| 336785 ||  || — || February 26, 2007 || Mount Lemmon || Mount Lemmon Survey || BRG || align=right | 1.8 km || 
|-id=786 bgcolor=#FA8072
| 336786 ||  || — || October 15, 2007 || Catalina || CSS || H || align=right data-sort-value="0.89" | 890 m || 
|-id=787 bgcolor=#fefefe
| 336787 ||  || — || December 21, 2006 || Kitt Peak || Spacewatch || — || align=right | 1.4 km || 
|-id=788 bgcolor=#fefefe
| 336788 ||  || — || July 30, 2005 || Palomar || NEAT || — || align=right data-sort-value="0.87" | 870 m || 
|-id=789 bgcolor=#E9E9E9
| 336789 ||  || — || September 9, 2004 || Kitt Peak || Spacewatch || — || align=right | 2.2 km || 
|-id=790 bgcolor=#fefefe
| 336790 ||  || — || May 10, 2000 || Anderson Mesa || LONEOS || H || align=right data-sort-value="0.89" | 890 m || 
|-id=791 bgcolor=#fefefe
| 336791 ||  || — || March 10, 2008 || Kitt Peak || Spacewatch || — || align=right data-sort-value="0.67" | 670 m || 
|-id=792 bgcolor=#fefefe
| 336792 ||  || — || August 17, 2009 || Kitt Peak || Spacewatch || — || align=right data-sort-value="0.75" | 750 m || 
|-id=793 bgcolor=#fefefe
| 336793 ||  || — || March 28, 2008 || Mount Lemmon || Mount Lemmon Survey || — || align=right data-sort-value="0.67" | 670 m || 
|-id=794 bgcolor=#FA8072
| 336794 ||  || — || August 10, 1994 || La Silla || E. W. Elst || H || align=right data-sort-value="0.85" | 850 m || 
|-id=795 bgcolor=#fefefe
| 336795 ||  || — || June 18, 2005 || Mount Lemmon || Mount Lemmon Survey || — || align=right | 1.0 km || 
|-id=796 bgcolor=#E9E9E9
| 336796 ||  || — || March 20, 2007 || Anderson Mesa || LONEOS || JUN || align=right | 1.4 km || 
|-id=797 bgcolor=#fefefe
| 336797 ||  || — || September 15, 2009 || Kitt Peak || Spacewatch || — || align=right data-sort-value="0.90" | 900 m || 
|-id=798 bgcolor=#fefefe
| 336798 ||  || — || January 8, 2007 || Kitt Peak || Spacewatch || — || align=right | 1.0 km || 
|-id=799 bgcolor=#fefefe
| 336799 ||  || — || March 16, 2004 || Kitt Peak || Spacewatch || NYS || align=right data-sort-value="0.75" | 750 m || 
|-id=800 bgcolor=#E9E9E9
| 336800 ||  || — || March 20, 2007 || Kitt Peak || Spacewatch || — || align=right | 1.4 km || 
|}

336801–336900 

|-bgcolor=#E9E9E9
| 336801 ||  || — || July 28, 2008 || La Sagra || OAM Obs. || — || align=right | 1.0 km || 
|-id=802 bgcolor=#fefefe
| 336802 ||  || — || April 22, 2004 || Kitt Peak || Spacewatch || — || align=right data-sort-value="0.82" | 820 m || 
|-id=803 bgcolor=#fefefe
| 336803 ||  || — || July 31, 2005 || Palomar || NEAT || FLO || align=right data-sort-value="0.80" | 800 m || 
|-id=804 bgcolor=#fefefe
| 336804 ||  || — || November 17, 2006 || Kitt Peak || Spacewatch || — || align=right data-sort-value="0.74" | 740 m || 
|-id=805 bgcolor=#fefefe
| 336805 ||  || — || June 13, 2005 || Mount Lemmon || Mount Lemmon Survey || — || align=right data-sort-value="0.86" | 860 m || 
|-id=806 bgcolor=#E9E9E9
| 336806 ||  || — || September 28, 2008 || Socorro || LINEAR || — || align=right | 1.9 km || 
|-id=807 bgcolor=#d6d6d6
| 336807 ||  || — || February 22, 2011 || Kitt Peak || Spacewatch || — || align=right | 3.7 km || 
|-id=808 bgcolor=#E9E9E9
| 336808 ||  || — || November 9, 2009 || Kitt Peak || Spacewatch || RAF || align=right | 1.3 km || 
|-id=809 bgcolor=#fefefe
| 336809 ||  || — || March 4, 2008 || Kitt Peak || Spacewatch || — || align=right data-sort-value="0.72" | 720 m || 
|-id=810 bgcolor=#fefefe
| 336810 ||  || — || March 15, 2004 || Socorro || LINEAR || — || align=right data-sort-value="0.90" | 900 m || 
|-id=811 bgcolor=#fefefe
| 336811 Baratoux ||  ||  || August 23, 2001 || Pic du Midi || Pic du Midi Obs. || — || align=right | 1.1 km || 
|-id=812 bgcolor=#E9E9E9
| 336812 ||  || — || September 7, 2004 || Kitt Peak || Spacewatch || EUN || align=right | 1.4 km || 
|-id=813 bgcolor=#fefefe
| 336813 ||  || — || November 1, 2005 || Mount Lemmon || Mount Lemmon Survey || NYS || align=right data-sort-value="0.95" | 950 m || 
|-id=814 bgcolor=#fefefe
| 336814 ||  || — || October 14, 1993 || Kitt Peak || Spacewatch || V || align=right | 1.1 km || 
|-id=815 bgcolor=#fefefe
| 336815 ||  || — || January 10, 2007 || Kitt Peak || Spacewatch || — || align=right | 1.2 km || 
|-id=816 bgcolor=#fefefe
| 336816 ||  || — || August 4, 2005 || Palomar || NEAT || — || align=right data-sort-value="0.90" | 900 m || 
|-id=817 bgcolor=#fefefe
| 336817 ||  || — || November 9, 2006 || Kitt Peak || Spacewatch || — || align=right data-sort-value="0.79" | 790 m || 
|-id=818 bgcolor=#E9E9E9
| 336818 ||  || — || March 20, 1999 || Apache Point || SDSS || — || align=right | 1.5 km || 
|-id=819 bgcolor=#E9E9E9
| 336819 ||  || — || April 7, 2003 || Kitt Peak || Spacewatch || — || align=right | 1.1 km || 
|-id=820 bgcolor=#fefefe
| 336820 ||  || — || January 24, 2007 || Mount Lemmon || Mount Lemmon Survey || — || align=right data-sort-value="0.99" | 990 m || 
|-id=821 bgcolor=#E9E9E9
| 336821 ||  || — || March 12, 2002 || Kitt Peak || Spacewatch || — || align=right | 1.6 km || 
|-id=822 bgcolor=#E9E9E9
| 336822 ||  || — || December 27, 2005 || Kitt Peak || Spacewatch || — || align=right | 1.1 km || 
|-id=823 bgcolor=#E9E9E9
| 336823 ||  || — || April 24, 2007 || Mount Lemmon || Mount Lemmon Survey || EUN || align=right | 1.2 km || 
|-id=824 bgcolor=#d6d6d6
| 336824 ||  || — || February 1, 2006 || Kitt Peak || Spacewatch || — || align=right | 4.1 km || 
|-id=825 bgcolor=#fefefe
| 336825 ||  || — || September 22, 2009 || Mount Lemmon || Mount Lemmon Survey || MAS || align=right data-sort-value="0.91" | 910 m || 
|-id=826 bgcolor=#E9E9E9
| 336826 ||  || — || January 6, 2006 || Kitt Peak || Spacewatch || — || align=right | 2.5 km || 
|-id=827 bgcolor=#fefefe
| 336827 ||  || — || September 18, 2009 || Kitt Peak || Spacewatch || — || align=right data-sort-value="0.94" | 940 m || 
|-id=828 bgcolor=#fefefe
| 336828 ||  || — || September 20, 2001 || Kitt Peak || Spacewatch || — || align=right data-sort-value="0.92" | 920 m || 
|-id=829 bgcolor=#E9E9E9
| 336829 ||  || — || October 23, 2004 || Kitt Peak || Spacewatch || HOF || align=right | 3.5 km || 
|-id=830 bgcolor=#E9E9E9
| 336830 ||  || — || March 19, 2002 || Anderson Mesa || LONEOS || — || align=right | 2.8 km || 
|-id=831 bgcolor=#d6d6d6
| 336831 ||  || — || January 16, 2005 || Kitt Peak || Spacewatch || — || align=right | 3.3 km || 
|-id=832 bgcolor=#E9E9E9
| 336832 ||  || — || September 10, 2004 || Kitt Peak || Spacewatch || — || align=right | 1.8 km || 
|-id=833 bgcolor=#E9E9E9
| 336833 ||  || — || September 23, 2008 || Kitt Peak || Spacewatch || ADE || align=right | 2.4 km || 
|-id=834 bgcolor=#E9E9E9
| 336834 ||  || — || October 6, 2004 || Kitt Peak || Spacewatch || — || align=right | 3.7 km || 
|-id=835 bgcolor=#fefefe
| 336835 ||  || — || April 5, 2000 || Socorro || LINEAR || NYS || align=right data-sort-value="0.90" | 900 m || 
|-id=836 bgcolor=#E9E9E9
| 336836 ||  || — || May 13, 2002 || Palomar || NEAT || — || align=right | 2.5 km || 
|-id=837 bgcolor=#d6d6d6
| 336837 ||  || — || April 20, 2006 || Kitt Peak || Spacewatch || — || align=right | 3.2 km || 
|-id=838 bgcolor=#E9E9E9
| 336838 ||  || — || September 26, 2008 || Kitt Peak || Spacewatch || AGN || align=right | 1.3 km || 
|-id=839 bgcolor=#d6d6d6
| 336839 ||  || — || February 15, 1994 || Kitt Peak || Spacewatch || — || align=right | 4.6 km || 
|-id=840 bgcolor=#d6d6d6
| 336840 ||  || — || December 19, 2004 || Mount Lemmon || Mount Lemmon Survey || — || align=right | 3.8 km || 
|-id=841 bgcolor=#fefefe
| 336841 ||  || — || February 21, 2007 || Kitt Peak || Spacewatch || — || align=right | 1.1 km || 
|-id=842 bgcolor=#d6d6d6
| 336842 ||  || — || May 24, 2006 || Kitt Peak || Spacewatch || EOS || align=right | 1.6 km || 
|-id=843 bgcolor=#E9E9E9
| 336843 ||  || — || October 7, 2008 || Mount Lemmon || Mount Lemmon Survey || — || align=right | 3.1 km || 
|-id=844 bgcolor=#E9E9E9
| 336844 ||  || — || January 31, 2006 || Kitt Peak || Spacewatch || HNA || align=right | 2.8 km || 
|-id=845 bgcolor=#fefefe
| 336845 ||  || — || August 30, 2005 || Kitt Peak || Spacewatch || V || align=right data-sort-value="0.74" | 740 m || 
|-id=846 bgcolor=#d6d6d6
| 336846 ||  || — || March 4, 2005 || Kitt Peak || Spacewatch || — || align=right | 3.7 km || 
|-id=847 bgcolor=#E9E9E9
| 336847 ||  || — || October 1, 2008 || Kitt Peak || Spacewatch || JUN || align=right | 1.1 km || 
|-id=848 bgcolor=#d6d6d6
| 336848 ||  || — || March 8, 2005 || Mount Lemmon || Mount Lemmon Survey || — || align=right | 2.7 km || 
|-id=849 bgcolor=#d6d6d6
| 336849 ||  || — || September 10, 2007 || Kitt Peak || Spacewatch || THM || align=right | 2.7 km || 
|-id=850 bgcolor=#d6d6d6
| 336850 ||  || — || October 26, 2008 || Mount Lemmon || Mount Lemmon Survey || — || align=right | 4.2 km || 
|-id=851 bgcolor=#E9E9E9
| 336851 ||  || — || July 30, 2008 || Kitt Peak || Spacewatch || — || align=right | 1.0 km || 
|-id=852 bgcolor=#fefefe
| 336852 ||  || — || April 12, 2004 || Anderson Mesa || LONEOS || NYS || align=right data-sort-value="0.68" | 680 m || 
|-id=853 bgcolor=#d6d6d6
| 336853 ||  || — || April 7, 2000 || Socorro || LINEAR || — || align=right | 4.3 km || 
|-id=854 bgcolor=#fefefe
| 336854 ||  || — || January 29, 2007 || Kitt Peak || Spacewatch || NYS || align=right data-sort-value="0.61" | 610 m || 
|-id=855 bgcolor=#E9E9E9
| 336855 ||  || — || September 6, 2008 || Catalina || CSS || — || align=right | 2.4 km || 
|-id=856 bgcolor=#fefefe
| 336856 ||  || — || November 19, 2006 || Kitt Peak || Spacewatch || — || align=right data-sort-value="0.75" | 750 m || 
|-id=857 bgcolor=#E9E9E9
| 336857 ||  || — || October 19, 1995 || Kitt Peak || Spacewatch || — || align=right | 2.9 km || 
|-id=858 bgcolor=#E9E9E9
| 336858 ||  || — || September 13, 2004 || Socorro || LINEAR || — || align=right | 1.2 km || 
|-id=859 bgcolor=#E9E9E9
| 336859 ||  || — || September 24, 2004 || Kitt Peak || Spacewatch || — || align=right | 2.1 km || 
|-id=860 bgcolor=#E9E9E9
| 336860 ||  || — || August 31, 2008 || Moletai || K. Černis || — || align=right | 1.3 km || 
|-id=861 bgcolor=#fefefe
| 336861 ||  || — || August 7, 2002 || Palomar || NEAT || — || align=right | 1.1 km || 
|-id=862 bgcolor=#fefefe
| 336862 ||  || — || October 25, 2005 || Kitt Peak || Spacewatch || V || align=right data-sort-value="0.64" | 640 m || 
|-id=863 bgcolor=#d6d6d6
| 336863 ||  || — || December 19, 2009 || Mount Lemmon || Mount Lemmon Survey || — || align=right | 3.0 km || 
|-id=864 bgcolor=#E9E9E9
| 336864 ||  || — || January 23, 2006 || Kitt Peak || Spacewatch || AGN || align=right | 1.7 km || 
|-id=865 bgcolor=#fefefe
| 336865 ||  || — || November 22, 2006 || Mount Lemmon || Mount Lemmon Survey || V || align=right data-sort-value="0.80" | 800 m || 
|-id=866 bgcolor=#E9E9E9
| 336866 ||  || — || December 6, 2005 || Kitt Peak || Spacewatch || — || align=right | 1.6 km || 
|-id=867 bgcolor=#E9E9E9
| 336867 ||  || — || September 1, 2003 || Socorro || LINEAR || — || align=right | 2.8 km || 
|-id=868 bgcolor=#fefefe
| 336868 ||  || — || February 1, 1995 || Kitt Peak || Spacewatch || — || align=right | 1.1 km || 
|-id=869 bgcolor=#d6d6d6
| 336869 ||  || — || February 1, 2005 || Catalina || CSS || — || align=right | 5.0 km || 
|-id=870 bgcolor=#E9E9E9
| 336870 ||  || — || July 15, 2007 || Siding Spring || SSS || — || align=right | 6.3 km || 
|-id=871 bgcolor=#E9E9E9
| 336871 ||  || — || January 8, 2002 || Palomar || NEAT || — || align=right | 2.1 km || 
|-id=872 bgcolor=#d6d6d6
| 336872 ||  || — || March 1, 2005 || Catalina || CSS || — || align=right | 3.9 km || 
|-id=873 bgcolor=#E9E9E9
| 336873 ||  || — || September 22, 2008 || Kitt Peak || Spacewatch || — || align=right | 1.5 km || 
|-id=874 bgcolor=#E9E9E9
| 336874 ||  || — || March 20, 2002 || Socorro || LINEAR || GEF || align=right | 1.7 km || 
|-id=875 bgcolor=#E9E9E9
| 336875 ||  || — || May 5, 2002 || Palomar || NEAT || — || align=right | 3.1 km || 
|-id=876 bgcolor=#E9E9E9
| 336876 ||  || — || May 23, 2003 || Kitt Peak || Spacewatch || AER || align=right | 1.8 km || 
|-id=877 bgcolor=#E9E9E9
| 336877 ||  || — || May 16, 2007 || XuYi || PMO NEO || — || align=right | 2.8 km || 
|-id=878 bgcolor=#E9E9E9
| 336878 ||  || — || August 21, 2003 || Campo Imperatore || CINEOS || — || align=right | 2.5 km || 
|-id=879 bgcolor=#E9E9E9
| 336879 ||  || — || October 7, 2008 || Mount Lemmon || Mount Lemmon Survey || — || align=right | 2.4 km || 
|-id=880 bgcolor=#E9E9E9
| 336880 ||  || — || March 13, 2007 || Mount Lemmon || Mount Lemmon Survey || — || align=right | 3.1 km || 
|-id=881 bgcolor=#d6d6d6
| 336881 ||  || — || April 6, 2005 || Palomar || NEAT || EUP || align=right | 5.1 km || 
|-id=882 bgcolor=#E9E9E9
| 336882 ||  || — || December 25, 2009 || Kitt Peak || Spacewatch || — || align=right | 2.3 km || 
|-id=883 bgcolor=#E9E9E9
| 336883 ||  || — || March 14, 2007 || Kitt Peak || Spacewatch || MAR || align=right | 1.2 km || 
|-id=884 bgcolor=#d6d6d6
| 336884 ||  || — || February 1, 2005 || Kitt Peak || Spacewatch || — || align=right | 2.7 km || 
|-id=885 bgcolor=#d6d6d6
| 336885 ||  || — || May 2, 2006 || Mount Lemmon || Mount Lemmon Survey || — || align=right | 2.8 km || 
|-id=886 bgcolor=#E9E9E9
| 336886 ||  || — || February 2, 2006 || Kitt Peak || Spacewatch || GEF || align=right | 3.4 km || 
|-id=887 bgcolor=#E9E9E9
| 336887 ||  || — || May 23, 2003 || Kitt Peak || Spacewatch || — || align=right | 1.2 km || 
|-id=888 bgcolor=#d6d6d6
| 336888 ||  || — || December 21, 2003 || Kitt Peak || Spacewatch || HYG || align=right | 6.0 km || 
|-id=889 bgcolor=#E9E9E9
| 336889 ||  || — || March 15, 2007 || Kitt Peak || Spacewatch || — || align=right | 1.1 km || 
|-id=890 bgcolor=#d6d6d6
| 336890 ||  || — || April 4, 2005 || Catalina || CSS || — || align=right | 4.8 km || 
|-id=891 bgcolor=#E9E9E9
| 336891 ||  || — || January 27, 2007 || Mount Lemmon || Mount Lemmon Survey || — || align=right | 1.6 km || 
|-id=892 bgcolor=#fefefe
| 336892 ||  || — || October 23, 2005 || Catalina || CSS || — || align=right | 1.5 km || 
|-id=893 bgcolor=#E9E9E9
| 336893 ||  || — || February 9, 2006 || Palomar || NEAT || GEF || align=right | 1.8 km || 
|-id=894 bgcolor=#E9E9E9
| 336894 ||  || — || March 10, 2002 || Bohyunsan || Bohyunsan Obs. || — || align=right | 1.9 km || 
|-id=895 bgcolor=#E9E9E9
| 336895 ||  || — || July 16, 2004 || Cerro Tololo || M. W. Buie || — || align=right | 1.4 km || 
|-id=896 bgcolor=#d6d6d6
| 336896 ||  || — || May 26, 2006 || Mount Lemmon || Mount Lemmon Survey || — || align=right | 3.7 km || 
|-id=897 bgcolor=#E9E9E9
| 336897 ||  || — || November 9, 2004 || Catalina || CSS || PAD || align=right | 3.1 km || 
|-id=898 bgcolor=#E9E9E9
| 336898 ||  || — || February 7, 2002 || Palomar || NEAT || — || align=right | 2.5 km || 
|-id=899 bgcolor=#E9E9E9
| 336899 ||  || — || March 29, 2011 || Mount Lemmon || Mount Lemmon Survey || PAD || align=right | 1.8 km || 
|-id=900 bgcolor=#E9E9E9
| 336900 ||  || — || April 16, 2007 || Mount Lemmon || Mount Lemmon Survey || — || align=right | 1.1 km || 
|}

336901–337000 

|-bgcolor=#d6d6d6
| 336901 ||  || — || May 24, 2006 || Catalina || CSS || — || align=right | 4.2 km || 
|-id=902 bgcolor=#E9E9E9
| 336902 ||  || — || May 6, 2002 || Palomar || NEAT || — || align=right | 3.0 km || 
|-id=903 bgcolor=#d6d6d6
| 336903 ||  || — || November 4, 2007 || Mount Lemmon || Mount Lemmon Survey || — || align=right | 4.8 km || 
|-id=904 bgcolor=#fefefe
| 336904 ||  || — || May 28, 2008 || Kitt Peak || Spacewatch || — || align=right data-sort-value="0.83" | 830 m || 
|-id=905 bgcolor=#E9E9E9
| 336905 ||  || — || September 29, 2008 || Catalina || CSS || WIT || align=right | 1.2 km || 
|-id=906 bgcolor=#E9E9E9
| 336906 ||  || — || February 27, 2006 || Kitt Peak || Spacewatch || — || align=right | 2.8 km || 
|-id=907 bgcolor=#fefefe
| 336907 ||  || — || March 26, 2003 || Kitt Peak || Spacewatch || — || align=right | 1.1 km || 
|-id=908 bgcolor=#d6d6d6
| 336908 ||  || — || March 23, 2006 || Kitt Peak || Spacewatch || — || align=right | 2.7 km || 
|-id=909 bgcolor=#E9E9E9
| 336909 ||  || — || September 8, 2008 || Kitt Peak || Spacewatch || AGN || align=right | 1.5 km || 
|-id=910 bgcolor=#d6d6d6
| 336910 ||  || — || December 12, 2004 || Kitt Peak || Spacewatch || KAR || align=right | 1.6 km || 
|-id=911 bgcolor=#d6d6d6
| 336911 ||  || — || December 19, 2009 || Mount Lemmon || Mount Lemmon Survey || HYG || align=right | 3.4 km || 
|-id=912 bgcolor=#d6d6d6
| 336912 ||  || — || June 14, 2007 || Kitt Peak || Spacewatch || CHA || align=right | 2.5 km || 
|-id=913 bgcolor=#d6d6d6
| 336913 ||  || — || April 12, 2005 || Mount Lemmon || Mount Lemmon Survey || — || align=right | 3.1 km || 
|-id=914 bgcolor=#E9E9E9
| 336914 ||  || — || April 11, 2007 || Kitt Peak || Spacewatch || — || align=right | 1.0 km || 
|-id=915 bgcolor=#E9E9E9
| 336915 ||  || — || October 25, 2008 || Socorro || LINEAR || HOF || align=right | 3.7 km || 
|-id=916 bgcolor=#d6d6d6
| 336916 ||  || — || June 13, 2001 || Kitt Peak || Spacewatch || EUP || align=right | 5.0 km || 
|-id=917 bgcolor=#d6d6d6
| 336917 ||  || — || February 25, 2006 || Mount Lemmon || Mount Lemmon Survey || — || align=right | 2.4 km || 
|-id=918 bgcolor=#E9E9E9
| 336918 ||  || — || September 28, 2003 || Socorro || LINEAR || — || align=right | 2.6 km || 
|-id=919 bgcolor=#E9E9E9
| 336919 ||  || — || May 4, 2002 || Kitt Peak || Spacewatch || NEM || align=right | 2.1 km || 
|-id=920 bgcolor=#d6d6d6
| 336920 ||  || — || September 14, 2007 || Catalina || CSS || — || align=right | 4.8 km || 
|-id=921 bgcolor=#d6d6d6
| 336921 ||  || — || August 24, 2001 || Anderson Mesa || LONEOS || — || align=right | 3.4 km || 
|-id=922 bgcolor=#d6d6d6
| 336922 ||  || — || April 6, 2000 || Kitt Peak || Spacewatch || — || align=right | 3.1 km || 
|-id=923 bgcolor=#d6d6d6
| 336923 ||  || — || August 16, 2001 || Palomar || NEAT || — || align=right | 3.9 km || 
|-id=924 bgcolor=#d6d6d6
| 336924 ||  || — || August 10, 2007 || Kitt Peak || Spacewatch || EOS || align=right | 2.0 km || 
|-id=925 bgcolor=#E9E9E9
| 336925 ||  || — || February 4, 2006 || Kitt Peak || Spacewatch || — || align=right | 1.7 km || 
|-id=926 bgcolor=#E9E9E9
| 336926 ||  || — || February 2, 2001 || Kitt Peak || Spacewatch || WIT || align=right | 1.1 km || 
|-id=927 bgcolor=#d6d6d6
| 336927 ||  || — || March 17, 2005 || Kitt Peak || Spacewatch || — || align=right | 3.3 km || 
|-id=928 bgcolor=#d6d6d6
| 336928 ||  || — || May 8, 2006 || Mount Lemmon || Mount Lemmon Survey || — || align=right | 3.4 km || 
|-id=929 bgcolor=#d6d6d6
| 336929 ||  || — || September 12, 2007 || Catalina || CSS || — || align=right | 3.5 km || 
|-id=930 bgcolor=#d6d6d6
| 336930 ||  || — || September 3, 2007 || Catalina || CSS || — || align=right | 3.6 km || 
|-id=931 bgcolor=#E9E9E9
| 336931 ||  || — || April 5, 2002 || Kitt Peak || Spacewatch || HNS || align=right | 1.8 km || 
|-id=932 bgcolor=#d6d6d6
| 336932 ||  || — || December 22, 2003 || Kitt Peak || Spacewatch || VER || align=right | 2.9 km || 
|-id=933 bgcolor=#d6d6d6
| 336933 ||  || — || March 13, 2005 || Kitt Peak || Spacewatch || — || align=right | 4.9 km || 
|-id=934 bgcolor=#E9E9E9
| 336934 ||  || — || May 11, 2007 || Catalina || CSS || — || align=right | 1.7 km || 
|-id=935 bgcolor=#fefefe
| 336935 ||  || — || November 19, 2001 || Socorro || LINEAR || — || align=right | 1.2 km || 
|-id=936 bgcolor=#E9E9E9
| 336936 ||  || — || February 22, 2006 || Catalina || CSS || — || align=right | 2.6 km || 
|-id=937 bgcolor=#d6d6d6
| 336937 ||  || — || October 10, 2007 || Mount Lemmon || Mount Lemmon Survey || EOS || align=right | 2.2 km || 
|-id=938 bgcolor=#d6d6d6
| 336938 ||  || — || September 30, 2008 || Mount Lemmon || Mount Lemmon Survey || — || align=right | 3.2 km || 
|-id=939 bgcolor=#d6d6d6
| 336939 ||  || — || March 13, 2005 || Anderson Mesa || LONEOS || EUP || align=right | 4.5 km || 
|-id=940 bgcolor=#fefefe
| 336940 ||  || — || March 13, 2007 || Kitt Peak || Spacewatch || V || align=right data-sort-value="0.88" | 880 m || 
|-id=941 bgcolor=#E9E9E9
| 336941 ||  || — || November 20, 2004 || Kitt Peak || Spacewatch || PAD || align=right | 1.7 km || 
|-id=942 bgcolor=#E9E9E9
| 336942 ||  || — || May 9, 2007 || Kitt Peak || Spacewatch || — || align=right | 2.9 km || 
|-id=943 bgcolor=#fefefe
| 336943 ||  || — || March 29, 2004 || Kitt Peak || Spacewatch || FLO || align=right | 1.5 km || 
|-id=944 bgcolor=#d6d6d6
| 336944 ||  || — || October 13, 2007 || Catalina || CSS || — || align=right | 3.7 km || 
|-id=945 bgcolor=#d6d6d6
| 336945 ||  || — || March 10, 2005 || Mount Lemmon || Mount Lemmon Survey || — || align=right | 3.3 km || 
|-id=946 bgcolor=#E9E9E9
| 336946 ||  || — || April 26, 2003 || Kitt Peak || Spacewatch || — || align=right | 1.0 km || 
|-id=947 bgcolor=#d6d6d6
| 336947 ||  || — || December 3, 2008 || Mount Lemmon || Mount Lemmon Survey || — || align=right | 3.7 km || 
|-id=948 bgcolor=#E9E9E9
| 336948 ||  || — || September 26, 2008 || Kitt Peak || Spacewatch || — || align=right | 2.4 km || 
|-id=949 bgcolor=#E9E9E9
| 336949 ||  || — || April 17, 2007 || Catalina || CSS || — || align=right | 2.5 km || 
|-id=950 bgcolor=#d6d6d6
| 336950 ||  || — || December 3, 2008 || Mount Lemmon || Mount Lemmon Survey || — || align=right | 3.6 km || 
|-id=951 bgcolor=#E9E9E9
| 336951 ||  || — || December 22, 2005 || Kitt Peak || Spacewatch || — || align=right | 1.7 km || 
|-id=952 bgcolor=#d6d6d6
| 336952 ||  || — || March 13, 2005 || Kitt Peak || Spacewatch || — || align=right | 4.3 km || 
|-id=953 bgcolor=#E9E9E9
| 336953 ||  || — || April 15, 2007 || Kitt Peak || Spacewatch || — || align=right data-sort-value="0.85" | 850 m || 
|-id=954 bgcolor=#fefefe
| 336954 ||  || — || October 31, 1999 || Kitt Peak || Spacewatch || — || align=right data-sort-value="0.77" | 770 m || 
|-id=955 bgcolor=#E9E9E9
| 336955 ||  || — || January 11, 2010 || Kitt Peak || Spacewatch || — || align=right | 2.4 km || 
|-id=956 bgcolor=#d6d6d6
| 336956 ||  || — || September 17, 1995 || Kitt Peak || Spacewatch || EUP || align=right | 6.3 km || 
|-id=957 bgcolor=#E9E9E9
| 336957 ||  || — || September 12, 2004 || Kitt Peak || Spacewatch || KON || align=right | 3.5 km || 
|-id=958 bgcolor=#E9E9E9
| 336958 ||  || — || March 24, 2006 || Kitt Peak || Spacewatch || — || align=right | 2.7 km || 
|-id=959 bgcolor=#d6d6d6
| 336959 ||  || — || July 27, 2001 || Haleakala || NEAT || — || align=right | 4.1 km || 
|-id=960 bgcolor=#d6d6d6
| 336960 ||  || — || August 17, 2001 || Palomar || NEAT || — || align=right | 3.6 km || 
|-id=961 bgcolor=#d6d6d6
| 336961 ||  || — || January 18, 2004 || Palomar || NEAT || — || align=right | 4.7 km || 
|-id=962 bgcolor=#d6d6d6
| 336962 ||  || — || April 26, 2006 || Anderson Mesa || LONEOS || BRA || align=right | 1.8 km || 
|-id=963 bgcolor=#d6d6d6
| 336963 ||  || — || June 29, 1995 || Kitt Peak || Spacewatch || — || align=right | 4.0 km || 
|-id=964 bgcolor=#d6d6d6
| 336964 ||  || — || December 22, 2003 || Kitt Peak || Spacewatch || EOS || align=right | 2.6 km || 
|-id=965 bgcolor=#d6d6d6
| 336965 ||  || — || March 18, 2001 || Kitt Peak || Spacewatch || — || align=right | 3.1 km || 
|-id=966 bgcolor=#d6d6d6
| 336966 ||  || — || October 13, 2007 || Mount Lemmon || Mount Lemmon Survey || — || align=right | 4.0 km || 
|-id=967 bgcolor=#d6d6d6
| 336967 ||  || — || October 15, 2001 || Apache Point || SDSS || — || align=right | 2.7 km || 
|-id=968 bgcolor=#E9E9E9
| 336968 ||  || — || March 24, 2006 || Kitt Peak || Spacewatch || — || align=right | 3.0 km || 
|-id=969 bgcolor=#d6d6d6
| 336969 ||  || — || February 14, 2010 || Mount Lemmon || Mount Lemmon Survey || — || align=right | 2.8 km || 
|-id=970 bgcolor=#E9E9E9
| 336970 ||  || — || September 28, 2003 || Kitt Peak || Spacewatch || — || align=right | 1.9 km || 
|-id=971 bgcolor=#d6d6d6
| 336971 ||  || — || April 7, 2006 || Kitt Peak || Spacewatch || — || align=right | 3.2 km || 
|-id=972 bgcolor=#d6d6d6
| 336972 ||  || — || September 14, 2002 || Kitt Peak || Spacewatch || — || align=right | 2.4 km || 
|-id=973 bgcolor=#d6d6d6
| 336973 ||  || — || November 6, 2008 || Kitt Peak || Spacewatch || — || align=right | 3.3 km || 
|-id=974 bgcolor=#d6d6d6
| 336974 ||  || — || January 2, 1998 || Kitt Peak || Spacewatch || — || align=right | 4.2 km || 
|-id=975 bgcolor=#E9E9E9
| 336975 ||  || — || September 17, 2003 || Kitt Peak || Spacewatch || — || align=right | 2.1 km || 
|-id=976 bgcolor=#d6d6d6
| 336976 ||  || — || March 10, 2005 || Mount Lemmon || Mount Lemmon Survey || THM || align=right | 2.8 km || 
|-id=977 bgcolor=#d6d6d6
| 336977 ||  || — || June 23, 2000 || Kitt Peak || Spacewatch || TIR || align=right | 3.8 km || 
|-id=978 bgcolor=#d6d6d6
| 336978 ||  || — || August 25, 2001 || Socorro || LINEAR || URS || align=right | 3.5 km || 
|-id=979 bgcolor=#E9E9E9
| 336979 ||  || — || October 1, 2003 || Kitt Peak || Spacewatch || — || align=right | 2.1 km || 
|-id=980 bgcolor=#d6d6d6
| 336980 ||  || — || January 2, 2009 || Mount Lemmon || Mount Lemmon Survey || HYG || align=right | 3.3 km || 
|-id=981 bgcolor=#fefefe
| 336981 ||  || — || October 26, 2005 || Kitt Peak || Spacewatch || — || align=right data-sort-value="0.90" | 900 m || 
|-id=982 bgcolor=#d6d6d6
| 336982 ||  || — || January 17, 2004 || Kitt Peak || Spacewatch || — || align=right | 4.0 km || 
|-id=983 bgcolor=#d6d6d6
| 336983 ||  || — || April 5, 2005 || Palomar || NEAT || EOS || align=right | 2.7 km || 
|-id=984 bgcolor=#E9E9E9
| 336984 ||  || — || December 2, 2004 || Kitt Peak || Spacewatch || — || align=right | 3.4 km || 
|-id=985 bgcolor=#d6d6d6
| 336985 ||  || — || March 26, 1995 || Kitt Peak || Spacewatch || EOS || align=right | 2.2 km || 
|-id=986 bgcolor=#d6d6d6
| 336986 ||  || — || March 3, 2005 || Catalina || CSS || — || align=right | 2.9 km || 
|-id=987 bgcolor=#E9E9E9
| 336987 ||  || — || October 7, 2005 || Mauna Kea || A. Boattini || — || align=right | 1.7 km || 
|-id=988 bgcolor=#d6d6d6
| 336988 ||  || — || October 13, 2007 || Mount Lemmon || Mount Lemmon Survey || — || align=right | 2.6 km || 
|-id=989 bgcolor=#d6d6d6
| 336989 ||  || — || July 27, 2001 || Anderson Mesa || LONEOS || — || align=right | 4.7 km || 
|-id=990 bgcolor=#d6d6d6
| 336990 ||  || — || March 4, 2000 || Kitt Peak || Spacewatch || K-2 || align=right | 1.8 km || 
|-id=991 bgcolor=#d6d6d6
| 336991 ||  || — || April 30, 2005 || Kitt Peak || Spacewatch || — || align=right | 3.1 km || 
|-id=992 bgcolor=#d6d6d6
| 336992 ||  || — || July 21, 2006 || Mount Lemmon || Mount Lemmon Survey || HYG || align=right | 3.6 km || 
|-id=993 bgcolor=#C2FFFF
| 336993 ||  || — || April 11, 2008 || Mount Lemmon || Mount Lemmon Survey || L5 || align=right | 9.5 km || 
|-id=994 bgcolor=#fefefe
| 336994 ||  || — || March 15, 2001 || Kitt Peak || Spacewatch || MAS || align=right data-sort-value="0.89" | 890 m || 
|-id=995 bgcolor=#d6d6d6
| 336995 ||  || — || November 18, 2003 || Kitt Peak || Spacewatch || — || align=right | 4.2 km || 
|-id=996 bgcolor=#E9E9E9
| 336996 ||  || — || September 19, 2001 || Socorro || LINEAR || — || align=right | 1.6 km || 
|-id=997 bgcolor=#FA8072
| 336997 ||  || — || January 3, 2001 || Socorro || LINEAR || H || align=right | 1.2 km || 
|-id=998 bgcolor=#d6d6d6
| 336998 ||  || — || April 19, 2006 || Mount Lemmon || Mount Lemmon Survey || — || align=right | 3.7 km || 
|-id=999 bgcolor=#fefefe
| 336999 ||  || — || March 27, 2009 || Siding Spring || SSS || H || align=right data-sort-value="0.67" | 670 m || 
|-id=000 bgcolor=#E9E9E9
| 337000 ||  || — || January 23, 2006 || Kitt Peak || Spacewatch || — || align=right | 2.9 km || 
|}

References

External links 
 Discovery Circumstances: Numbered Minor Planets (335001)–(340000) (IAU Minor Planet Center)

0336